There are a number of places named after famous people. For more on the general etymology of place names see toponymy. For other lists of eponyms (names derived from people) see eponym.

Continents
 Americas (North America and South America) – Amerigo Vespucci

Countries

This is a summary of country name etymologies.
 Bharat – original name for India, derived from either Dushyanta's son Bharata or Rishabha's son Bharata
 Bolivia – Simón Bolívar
 Cambodia – Kambu Svayambhuva
 Colombia – Christopher Columbus (after the Italian version of his name, Cristoforo Colombo)
 Cook Islands – Captain James Cook
 Dominican Republic – Saint Dominic
 El Salvador – "The Saviour", referring to Jesus
 Eswatini - Mswati II
 Israel – Jacob (alternative name)
 Kiribati – Thomas Gilbert
 Liechtenstein – Anton Florian of Liechtenstein
 Marshall Islands – John Marshall
 Mauritius – Maurice of Nassau
 Mozambique – Mussa Bin Bique
 Philippines – Philip II of Spain
 Saint Kitts and Nevis – Saint Christopher
 Saint Lucia – Lucy of Syracuse (?)
 Saint Vincent and the Grenadines – Saint Vincent
 San Marino – Saint Marinus
 São Tomé and Príncipe – Saint Thomas
 Saudi Arabia – Muhammad bin Saud
 Seychelles – Jean Moreau de Sechelles
 Solomon Islands – Solomon
 Uzbekistan - Öz Beg Khan of Golden Horde

Former countries
 Principality of Antioch, now part of Turkey – Antiochus, father of Seleucus I Nicator
 Lotharingia (Lorraine), now part of Belgium, France, Germany, Luxembourg, and the Netherlands – Lothair I
 Northern Rhodesia, now Zambia – Cecil Rhodes
 Southern Rhodesia, now Zimbabwe – Cecil Rhodes
 Terra Mariana ("Land of Mary"), now Estonia and Latvia – Mary, mother of Jesus

British Overseas Territories
 Bermuda – Juan de Bermúdez
 Falkland Islands – Anthony Cary, 5th Viscount Falkland
 Gibraltar – Tariq ibn Ziyad (from )
 Saint Helena, Ascension and Tristan da Cunha – Helena of Constantinople, and Tristão da Cunha
 South Georgia and the South Sandwich Islands – George III and John Montagu, 4th Earl of Sandwich, respectively.

"Lands" of Antarctica
Adélie Land – Adèle Dumont d'Urville
Edward VII Land – King Edward VII
Queen Maud Land – Queen Maud of Norway
Ross Dependency – James Clark Ross
Victoria Land – Queen Victoria

Towns and cities
 Caesarea (disambiguation) (various cities in various countries) – Julius Caesar or Roman emperors

Afghanistan
 Ahmad Abad, Afghanistan – Ahmad Shah Massoud
 Ahmad Shah Baba Mina – Ahmad Shah Durrani
 Ai-Khanoum, formerly named Alexandria on the Oxus – Alexander the Great
 Ayub Khan Mena (Kabul) – Ayub Khan (Emir of Afghanistan)
 Ghaziabad, Kunar – Amir Muhammad Ghazi Khan Shaheed (died in 1980s)
 Ghazi Amanullah Khan Town – Amanullah Khan
 Jalalabad – Jalal-ud-Din Muhammad Akbar
 Jamal Mena, Kabul – Jamāl al-Dīn al-Afghānī
 Kandahar – Alexander the Great
 Khwaja Bahauddin District- Khwaja Bahauddin, Naqshband of Turkistan
 Khushal Khan Mena – Khushal Khattak
 Mohammad Agha District – Agha Mohammad Khan Qajar, a founder of the Qajar dynasty
 Nadir Shah Kot District – Mohammed Nadir Shah
 Sheberghan – Shapur II
 Sher Khan Bandar – Sher Khan Nashir
 Wazir Akbar Khan, Kabul and Wazirabad, Kabul – Wazir Akbar Khan

Albania
 Ali Demi (neighborhood) – Ali Demi
 Asim Zeneli (Albania) – Asim Zeneli, Albanian hero
 Bajram Curri (town) – Albanian activist of Independence Bajram Curri
 Blloku Vasil Shanto – Vasil Shanto, Albanian hero
 Don Bosco (Tirana) – John Bosco
 Kastriot, Albania – George Kastrioti Skanderbeg
 Mihal Grameno (neighborhood) – Mihal Grameno
 Skënderbegas – George Kastrioti Skanderbeg

Algeria
 Abdelkader Azil – Abdelkader Azil (1927–1959), Algerian activist
 Abou El Hassen – Abu al-Hassan (1934–1962), Algerian independence hero
 Ahmed Rachedi, Mila – Ahmed Rachedi (1930–1957), Algerian revolutionary martyr
 Assi Youcef – Bouiri Boualem (Youcef) (1927–1960), Algerian military
 Bekkouche Lakhdar – Bekkouche Lakhdar (d.1958), Algerian martyr
 Belouizdad, Algiers – Algerian militant and nationalist Mohamed Belouizdad 
 Benabdelmalek Ramdane – Abdelmalek Ramdane (d.1954), first martyr of the revolution
 Bennasser Benchohra – Al-Nasser Bin Fameh (1804–1884)
 Bordj Badji Mokhtar – Badji Mokhtar (1919–1954), Algerian revolutionary
 Bordj Emir Khaled – Khalid ibn Hashim, grandson of the military leader Abd al Qadir 
 Bordj Omar Driss – Commander Omar Driss (1931–1959)
 Bouraoui Belhadef – Bouraoui Ali Ben Cherif, a local hero of the national liberation war
 Constantine (Algeria) – Constantine the Great
 Didouche Mourad – Mourad Didouche, a veteran of the Algerian War of independence 
 El Emir Abdelkader, Aïn Témouchent and Emir Abdelkader, Jijel – Emir Abdelkader
 Hassani Abdelkrim – Hassani Abdul Karim (d.1960)
 Hussein Dey (commune) – Hussein Dey
 Méchraâ Houari Boumédienne – Houari Boumédiène, President of Algeria
 Messaoud Boudjeriou – Messaoud Boudjeriou (1930–1961), Algerian revolutionary
 Mohammed Boudiaf (M'Sila) – Mohamed Boudiaf, President of Algeria
 Mostefa Ben Brahim, Sid Bel Abbés – Mostefa Ben Brahim (1800–1867), Algerian poet
 Ramdane Djamel – Ramdane Ahcène (1934–1962), hero of the national liberation
 Salah Bey (town) – Salah Bey ben Mostefa
 Salah Bouchaour – Salah Bouchaour (1933–1962), Algerian revolutionary martyr
 Sidi Bel Abbès – Sidi Bel Abbès El Bouzidi (d.1780), a Muslim marabout 
 Sidi M'Hamed – Sidi M'hamed Bou Qobrine
 Zighoud Youcef (Town) – Youcef Zighoud, guerrilla leader
 Zmalet El Emir Abdelkader – Emir Abdelkader

Angola
 Comandante Valódia (Luanda) – Joaquim Domingos Augusto "Valódia" (died 1975), one of the prominent generals during the Angolan War of Independence
 Moçâmedes – Governor General of Angola, José D'Almeida Vasconcelos de Oliveira de Soveral e Carvalho, Baron of Mossâmedes (died 1805)
 Nelito Soares (Luanda) – Nelito Soares (1943–1975), Angolan revolutionary
 Patrice Lumumba, Luanda – Patrice Lumumba, Congolese Prime Minister
 Porto Alexandre, Angola - James Edward Alexander
 Rocha Pinto (Luanda) – João Teixeira Pinto
 Sá da Bandeira (Huambo) - Bernardo de Sá Nogueira de Figueiredo, 1st Marquis of Sá da Bandeira
 Viana, Luanda – Governor General of Angola, Horácio José de Sá Viana Rebelo (1910–1995)

Former:

 Carmona was the name of Uíge - Oscar Carmona, Portuguese President
 Henrique de Carvalho was the name of Saurimo - Henrique de Carvalho (1844-1909)
 Sá da Bandeira was the name of Lubango - Bernardo de Sá Nogueira de Figueiredo, 1st Marquis of Sá da Bandeira
 Serpa Pinto was the name of Menongue - Alexandre de Serpa Pinto, Portuguese explorer
 Silva Porto was the name of Cuito - António da Silva Porto
 Vila Arriaga was the name of Bibala - Portuguese President Manuel José de Arriaga 
 Vila Gago Coutinho was the name of Lumbala N'guimbo - Carlos Viegas Gago Coutinho 
 Villa João de Almeida was the name of Chibia - João de Almeida (1873-1953), Portuguese military
 Vila Pereira d'Eça was the name of Ondjiva - António Júlio da Costa Pereira de Eça
 Vila Robert Williams was the name of Caála - Sir Robert Williams, 1st Baronet, of Park
 Vila Roçadas was the name of Xangongo - José Augusto Alves Roçadas
 Vila Salazar was the name of N'dalatando - António de Oliveira Salazar, Portuguese dictator
 Vila Teixeira da Silva was the name of Bailundo - Francisco Teixeira da Silva (1826-1894), Portuguese colonial administrator

Andorra
 Meritxell – Our Lady of Meritxell

Antigua and Barbuda
 Codrington, Antigua and Barbuda – Christopher Codrington

Argentina
 Avellaneda – Nicolás Avellaneda
 Doctor Atilio Oscar Viglione – Atilio Oscar Viglione (1914–2010), Governor of Chubut
 (General) Belgrano – Many cities and towns after Manuel Belgrano
 Castelli – Many places after Juan José Castelli
 Ciudad Evita (means Evita City) – Eva Perón, First Lady of Argentina
 General Pueyrredón – second-level administrative subdivision named after Juan Martín de Pueyrredón
 Las Heras – Many places after Juan Gregorio de las Heras
 Presidencia de la Plaza – Victorino de la Plaza, President of Argentina
 Presidencia Roque Sáenz Peña – Roque Sáenz Peña, President of Argentina
 Presidente Perón Partido – Juan Domingo Peron, President of Argentina
 Pueblo Illia (Misiones) – Arturo Umberto Illia, President of Argentina
 Rafaela, Santa Fe Province – Rafaela Rodríguez de Egusquiza
 Rawson – Guillermo Rawson
 Rivadavia Department – Many cities and towns after Bernardino Rivadavia, First President of Argentina
 Rosario Vera Peñaloza Department – Rosario Vera Peñaloza (1873–1950), Argentine teacher
 (General) San Martín – Many cities and towns after José de San Martín
 Sarmiento – Many municipalities and cities after Domingo Faustino Sarmiento
 Trelew – Lewis Jones
 Uriburu, La Pampa – Jose Felix Uriburu, President of Argentina
 Vicente López, Buenos Aires – Vicente López y Planes
 Villa General Mitre – Bartolomé Mitre
 formerly: Ciudad Eva Perón (means Eva Perón City) – Eva Perón, First Lady of Argentina; now La Plata

Armenia
 Abovyan and Abovyan, Ararat  – Khachatur Abovyan, writer
 Anushavan – Dr. Anushavan Galoyan (1901–1945), World War II hero
 Artashat (Artaxata) – Artaxias I, Armenian king
 Baghramyan, Ararat, Baghramyan, Armavir and Baghramyan, Echmiadzin – Hovhannes Bagramyan, Armenian marshal and military commander
 Bagratashen – Bagrat Vardanian (1894–1971), hero of Socialist Labor
 Beniamin – Beniamin Galstian (1902–1942), World War II general
 Charentsavan – Yeghishe Charents, poet
 Chkalov, Armenia and Chkalovka – Valery Chkalov, Russian pilot
 David Bek, Armenia – Davit Bek, Armenian patriot
 Dimitrov, Armenia – Georgi Dimitrov, Bulgarian Communist leader
 Ferik – Ferik Polatbekov (1897–1918), revolutionary and poet
 Fioletovo – Ivan Fioletov, socialist martyr and Baku Commissar
 Gagarin, Armenia – Yuri Gagarin, Russian cosmonaut
 Gharibjanian – Bagrat Gharibjanian (1890–1920), Bolshevik martyr
 Ghukasavan – Ghukas Ghukasian (1899–1920), founder of Armenia's Communist Youth Movement
 Griboyedov, Armenia – Alexandr Griboyedov, Russian diplomat and author
 Gusanagyugh – "Gusan" (given name: Nakhshikar Sargis), bard
 Imeni Kirova, Armenia – Sergey Kirov, Bolshevik leader
 Imeni Tairova – Alexander Tairov, Armenian theater director
 Isahakyan – Avetik Isahakyan, poet
 Kamo, Armenia – Kamo (Bolshevik) (1882–1922), nom de guerre of Simon Ter-Petrossian
 Khanjian, Armenia – Aghasi Khanjian, first secretary of the Armenian Communist Party
 Kuchak – Nahapet Kuchak, 16th-century bard
 Kuybyshev, Armenia – Valerian Kuybyshev, Russian politician
 Lermontovo – Mikhail Lermontov, Russian writer and poet
 Lukashin and Lukashin, Yerevan – Sargis Lukashin, Armenian prime minister
 Martiros, Vayots Dzor – Armenian Prince Martireni, who was martyred against Persian forces
 Martuni, Armenia, Martuni (village) and Myasnikyan – Aleksandr Myasnikyan, first Communist president of Armenia, whose nom de guerre was "Martuni"
 Mayakovski, Armenia – Vladimir Mayakovsky, Russian poet
 Mergelyan (Yerevan) – Sergey Mergelyan, Armenian scientist
 Mikhaylovka, Armenia – Timofei Mikhailov, Russian revolutionary and regicide
 Mkhchyan – after an Armenian commander
 Musayelyan, Ashotsk – Capt. Sargis Musayelian (1882–1920), Bolshevik military leader
 Nagapetavan – Nahapet Kurghinian (1900-1937), participant in the Bolshevik uprising in May 1920
 Nalbandyan, Armenia – Mikael Nalbandian, writer
 Narek, Ararat – Grigor Narekatsi, medieval monk and poet
 Nizami, Armenia – Nizami Ganjevi, Persian poet
 Paruyr Sevak, Armenia – Paruyr Sevak, poet
 Poselok Imeni Kalinina – Mikhail Kalinin, Soviet leader
 Pushkino, Armenia – Alexander Pushkin, Russian author and poet
 Sarukhan – Hovhannes Sarukhanian (1882–1920), Communist revolutionary
 Sayat-Nova, Armenia – Harutyun Sayatyan, poet
 Shahumyan, Ararat, Shahumyan, Armavir, Shahumyan, Lori, Shahumyan, Yerevan and Stepanavan – Stepan Shahumyan, Bolshevik commissar
 Spandaryan, Shirak, Spandaryan, Syunik and Surenavan – Suren Spandaryan, Armenian revolutionary
 Sverdlov, Armenia – Yakov Sverdlov, Bolshevik leader
 Tumanyan, Armenia – Hovhannes Tumanyan, writer
 Yenokavan – Enok Mkrtumian (1896–1920), early Communist
 Zhdanov, Lori – Andrei Zhdanov

Former:
 Akhundov was the name of Punik – Mirza Fatali Akhundov, author
 Azizbekov was the name of Aregnadem – Meshadi Azizbekov, Soviet revolutionary
 Azizbekov was the name of Vayk – Meshadi Azizbekov
 Azizbekov was the name of Zarritap – Meshadi Azizbekov
 Batikian was the name of Gandzak, Armenia – Batik Batikian (1892–1920), Communist martyr
 Danushavan was the name of Aygehat – Danush Shahverdian, Armenian politician and diplomat
 Ghukasyan was the name of Ashotsk – Ghukas Ghukasian, founder of Armenia's Communist Youth Movement
 Imeni Beriya was the name of Shahumyan, Ararat – Lavrentiy Beria, Soviet politician and head of the secret police
 Imeni Beriya was the name of Zhdanov, Armavir – Lavrentiy Beria
 Imeni Stalina was the name of Sovkhoz Nomer Shest – Joseph Stalin
 Imeni Voroshilova was the name of Hatsik, Armavir – Kliment Voroshilov, Marshal of the Soviet Union
 Kalinin was the name of Noramarg – Mikhail Kalinin, Soviet leader
 Kalinino was the name of Tashir – Mikhail Kalinin
 Kamo was the name of Gavar – Kamo (Bolshevik) (1882–1922), nom de guerre of Simon Ter-Petrossian
 Kirov was the name of Amrakits – Sergey Kirov, early Bolshevik leader
 Kirov was the name of Taperakan – Sergey Kirov
 Kirovakan was the name of Vanadzor – Sergey Kirov
 Kirovka was the name of Mamai, Armenia – Sergey Kirov
 Kuybyshev was the name of Haghartsin, Armenia – Valerian Kuybyshev, Soviet leader
 Maksim Gorkiy was the name of Bovadzor – Maxim Gorky, Soviet author
 Mikoyan was the name of Yeghegnadzor – Anastas Mikoyan, Soviet leader
 Mravyan was the name of Yeghipatrush – Askanaz Mravyan, leader of Soviet Armenia
 Ordzhonikidze was the name of Vahan, Armenia – Sergo Ordzhonikidze, Soviet leader
 Samed Vurgun was the name of Hovk – Samad Vurgun, Soviet poet
 Shavarshavan was the name of Koti, Armenia – Shavarsh Amirkhanian, leader of the precursor to the Armenian KGB
 Spandaryan was the name of Silikyan – Suren Spandaryan, Armenian revolutionary
 Tumanyan was the name of Dsegh – Hovhannes Tumanyan, writer
 Vagharshapat was the name of Echmiadzin – King Vologases I (Vagharsh I)
 Vorontsovka was the name of Tashir – Prince Mikhail Semyonovich Vorontsov, viceroy of the Caucasus

Australia

Austria
 Amaliendorf-Aalfang – Maria Amalia, Duchess of Parma
 Arnoldstein – Austrian knight and founder named Arnold
 Elisabeth-Vorstadt (Salzburg) – Empress Elisabeth of Austria
 Hugo Breitner Hof (Vienna) – Hugo Breitner (1873–1946), Social Democrat politician
 Jakomini – Kaspar Andreas von Jacomini (1726–1805), speculator
 Josefstadt – Joseph I, Holy Roman Emperor
 Josef-Rautmann-Hof (Vienna) – Josef Rautmann (1890–1970)
 Kaisersdorf – Franz Joseph I of Austria
 Leopoldsdorf – Archduke Leopold Ferdinand of Austria
 Leopoldskron-Moos (Salzburg) – Leopold Anton von Firmian (1679–1744), Archbishop of Salzburg
 Leopoldstadt – Leopold I Holy Roman Emperor
 Per-Albin-Hansson-Siedlung (Wien) – Per Albin Hansson, Swedish politician
 Rennersdorf, Austria – Karl Renner
 Rudolfsheim-Fünfhaus – Crown Prince Rudolf of Austria
 St. Pölten – The name Sankt Pölten is derived from Hippolytus of Rome. The city was renamed to Sankt Hippolyt, then Sankt Polyt and finally Sankt Pölten.
 Sankt Wolfgang-Kienberg – Wolfgang of Regensburg
 Wilhelmsburg, Austria – William, Duke of Austria
 Wilhelmsdorf (Wien) – Father Wilhelm Sedlaczek (1793–1848)

Azerbaijan

Bahamas
 George Town, Bahamas – George III of Great Britain
 Matthew Town – George Buckley-Mathew, Bahamian governor in 1844–1849
 Nassau, Bahamas – William III of England
 Nicholls Town – Edward Nicolls

Bahrain
 Hamad Town – Hamad ibn Isa Al Khalifah
 Isa Town – Isa ibn Salman Al Khalifah

Bangladesh
 Cox's Bazar – Captain Hiram Cox
 Faridpur District – Sufi saint Shah Fariduddin Masud,  follower of the Chishti order of Ajmer
 Madaripur District – Sufi saint 'Sayed Badiuddin Zinda Shah Madar
 Mostafapur Union – Sufi saint Shah Mustafa
 Moulvibazar, Moulvibazar Sadar, Moulvibazar District –  Syed Moulvi Qudratullah Munsef, Muslim cleric and judge
 Mujibnagar – Sheikh Mujibur Rahman, President of Bangladesh
 Osmani Nagar Upazila – General M.A.G Osmani
 Pirojpur District –  Firoz Shah
 Rajshahi District – the Puthia Raj family
 Shariatpur District – Haji Shariatullah, eminent Islamic reformer of the Indian subcontinent in British India
 Sher-e-Bangla Nagar – A. K. Fazlul Huq, Bengali lawyer, legislator and statesman
 Sherpur District – Sher Ali Gazi, the last jaghirdar of the Gazi dynasty

Barbados
 Speightstown – William Speight (legislator)

Belarus
 Barysaw – Boris-Rogvolod Vseslavich
 Braslaw – Bryachislav of Polotsk
 Budenovka (Minsk) - Semyon Budyonny
 Davyd-Haradok – Prince David Igorevich
 Dzyarzhynsk – Felix Dzerzhinsky
 Gusarovka (Gomel) – Nikolai Gusarov
 Kirawsk – Sergey Kirov
 Leninski, Belarus – Vladimir Lenin
 Molotovki (Mogilev) – Vyacheslav Molotov

Belgium
 Albert Canal – Albert I of Belgium
 Charleroi – Charles II of Spain
 Geraardsbergen – Geraard van Hunnegem, a manor local
 Leopoldsburg – Leopold I of Belgium and Bourg, urban planner of the city
 Martelange – Martelius
 Philippeville – Philip II of Spain
 Quartier Marais-Jacqmain (Brussels) – Émile Jacqmain (1860–1933), Belgian engineer
 Quartier Midi-Lemonnier (Brussels) – Charles Lemonnier, Belgian liberal politician
 Saint-Georges-sur-Meuse – Saint George
 Saint-Gilles – Saint Giles
 Saint-Hubert – Hubertus
 Saint-Nicolas – Saint Nicholas
 Sint-Agatha-Berchem – Agatha of Sicily
 Sint-Amands – Saint Amand
 Sint-Gillis-Waas – Saint Giles
 Sint-Laureins – Lawrence of Rome
 Sint-Martens-Latem – Martin of Tours
 Sint-Niklaas – Saint Nicholas
 Sint-Pieters-Leeuw – Saint Peter
 Sint-Truiden – Trudo
 Woluwe-Saint-Lambert – Lambert of Maastricht
 Woluwe-Saint-Pierre – Saint Peter

Belize

 Albert (Belize House constituency) – Prince Albert Victor, Duke of Clarence and Avondale
 Flowers Bank – William Flowers (d.1786)
 Fort George (Belize House constituency) – George III of the United Kingdom
 Victoria Peak (Belize) – Queen Victoria

Benin
 Malanville – Henri Malan, French Governor of Dahomey

Bermuda
 Hamilton – Henry Hamilton

Bhutan
 Jigme Dorji – King Jigme Dorji Wangchuck
 Wangdue Phodrang – Wangdi, boy playing in a river

Bolivia
 Abel Iturralde Province – Abel Iturralde Palacios (1869–1935), Bolivian politician
 Alonso de Ibáñez Province – José Alonso de Ibáñez, resistance hero from Potosi
 Andrés Ibáñez Province – Andrés Ibáñez (1844–1877), leader of the federal revolution in Santa Cruz
 Ángel Sandoval Province – Dr. Angel Sandoval Peña (1871–1941)
 Aniceto Arce Province – Aniceto Arce Ruiz, President of Bolivia
 Antonio Quijarro Province – Dr. Antonio Quijarro Quevedo (1831–1903), Bolivian politician
 Azurduy Province – Juana Azurduy de Padilla, revolutionary guerrilla
 Bautista Saavedra Province – Bautista Saavedra Mallea, President of Bolivia
 Belisario Boeto Province – Belisario Boeto (1841–1900), Bolivian diplomat during a War of the Pacific
 Bernardino Bilbao Province – General Bernardino Bilbao Rioja (1895–1983), Bolivian military figure and politician
 Bolívar Province, Cochabamba – Simon Bolivar, Venezuelan military and political leader
 Burdett O'Connor Province – Francisco Burdett O'Connor, chronicler of the South American War of Independence and the making of Tarija
 Carlos Medinaceli (Potosi) – Carlos Medinaceli Lizarazu (1789–1841), Bolivian military
 Carrasco Province – Dr. Jose Carrasco Torrico (1863–1921), Vice president of Bolivia 
 Cornelio Saavedra Province – Cornelio Saavedra, president of the Argentine First Junta
 Daniel Campos Province – Daniel Campos Cortes (1829–1902), Bolivian poet
 Eduardo Abaroa Province – Colonel Eduardo Abaroa, hero of the War of the Pacific
 El Carmen Rivero Tórrez (Santa Cruz) – Juan Rivero Tórres (1897–1951), a Bolivian engineer
 Eliodoro Camacho Province – Eliodoro Camacho, Bolivian politician, party leader, and presidential candidate
 Enrique Baldivieso Province – Enrique Baldivieso, Vice president of Bolivia under German Busch
 Esteban Arce Province – General Esteban Arce (1765–1815), Bolivian independence hero
 Eustaquio Méndez Province – Eustaquio Méndez Arenas (1784–1841), warrior leader of Tarija
 Franz Tamayo Province – Franz Tamayo, Bolivian intellectual, writer and politician
 Federico Román Province – General Federico Roman Calderon (1875–1943), Hero of the Chaco War
 Germán Busch Province – Germán Busch Becerra, former Bolivian military officer, hero of the Chaco War, and President of Bolivia
 Germán Jordán Province – Germán Jordán (1890–1932), a hero of the Chaco War
 Gualberto Villarroel Province – Gualberto Villarroel, President of Bolivia, who was killed in 1946 under his presidency
 Hernando Siles Province – Hernando Siles Reyes, President of Bolivia
 José Ballivián Province – José Ballivián, President of Bolivia
 José Manuel Pando Province – José Manuel Pando (1848–1917) president of Bolivia 
 José María Avilés Province – General José María Avilés (1784–1838), a hero who was fighting during the Peru-Bolivian Confederation campaign 
 José María Linares Province – José María Linares, President of Bolivia
 Ladislao Cabrera Province – Ladislao Cabrera, Bolivian hero during the War of the Pacific
 Loayza Province – Jose Ramon Loayza (1751–1839), President of Bolivia
 Luis Calvo – Luis Calvo Calvimontes (1879-1944), Bolivian lawyer and senator
 Manco Kapac Province – Manco Capac
 Manuel María Caballero Province – Manuel María Caballero (1819–1865), one of the signatories of the Bolivian constitution of 5 August 1861
 Marcelo Quiroga Santa Cruz (Cochabamba) - Marcelo Quiroga Santa Cruz
 Maximiliano Paredes (Cochabamba) - Maximiliano Paredes (1879-1900), Bolivian soldier
 Modesto Omiste Province – Modesto Omiste Tinajeros, Bolivian writer and politician 
 Monseñor Salvatierra (Santa Cruz) – José Andrés de Salvatierra (1772–1862), Bolivian priest and independence hero
 Monteagudo, Bolivia - Bernardo de Monteagudo
 Muñecas Province – Idelfonso de las Muñecas (1776–1816), priest and leader of the War of Independence
 Narciso Campero Province – Narciso Campero, President of Bolivia
 Nicolás Suárez Province – Nicolás Suárez Callaú
 Ñuflo de Chávez Province – conquistador Ñuflo de Chaves
 Obispo Santistevan Province – Monseñor José Belisario Santistevan Seoane (1843–1931)
 Oropeza Province – Samuel Oropeza (d.1907), an illustrious Bolivian statesman
 Padilla, Bolivia – Manuel Ascencio Padilla, an Upper Peruvian guerrilla chief
 Paz Estenssoro Viejo (Santa Cruz) – Victor Paz Estenssoro, President of Bolivia
 Puerto Siles – Hernando Siles Reyes
 Puerto Villarroel – Gualberto Villarroel, President of Bolivia
 Rafael Bustillo Province – Rafael Bustillo (1813–1873), Bolivian diplomat and foreign secretary
 Ramón Darío Gutiérrez (Itenez, Beni) – Ramón Darío Gutiérrez (1907–1987), minister of the interior
 Rufino Carrasco (Potosi) – Rufino Carrasco (1817–1891), Bolivian military during the war of the pacific
 San Ignacio de Velasco – José Miguel de Velasco Franco, President of Bolivia
 Sebastián Pagador Province – Sebastián Pagador Miranda (1733–1781), patriot of Upper Peru 
 Sucre – Antonio José de Sucre
 Tarija - Tariq ibn Ziyad
 Teniente Bullaín (Oruro) - José Bullaín (1907-1934), Hero of the Chaco war
 Tomas Barrón Province – Colonel Tomas Barrón (d.1810), an Independence hero
 Tomás Frías Province – Tomás Frías Ametller, President of Bolivia
 Tupac Katari, Santa Cruz - Tupac Katari
 Uriondo – Francisco Uriondo (1784–1822)
 Urriolagoitia, Chuquisaca – Mamerto Urriolagoitía
 Vaca Díez Province – Antonio Vaca Diez (1840–1897)
 Villa Abecia – Dr. Valentin Abecia (1846–1910)
 Villa Banzer, Beni - Hugo Banzer
 Villa Barrientos (La Paz) - René Barrientos
 Villa Vaca Guzmán - Santiago Vaca Guzmán (1847-1896)
 Villamontes – Ismael Montes, President of Bolivia
 Villazón – Eliodoro Villazón
 Waldo Ballivián Municipality - Waldo Ballivián Soria-Galvarro (1917-1946)
 Warnes, Bolivia – Ignacio Warnes, military leader in the South American war of independence
 Zudáñez - Jaime de Zudáñez

Bosnia and Herzegovina
 Mrkonjić Grad – King Peter I of Serbia who had taken the nom de guerre "Mrkonjić" while fighting against the Ottoman Empire
 Tomislavgrad – King Tomislav of Croatia or Prince Tomislav of Yugoslavia

Botswana
 Francistown – Daniel Francis (1840-1921), English prospector
 Gaborone – Chief Gaborone

Brazil
For a longer list, please see List of places in Brazil named after people.

 Salvador, Brazil – Jesus (the Christian Savior)
 São Luís, Maranhão, Brazil – Louis IX of France (Saint Louis)
 São Paulo – Saint Paul

Brunei
 Bandar Seri Begawan – Omar Ali Saifuddien III

Bulgaria
 Anton, Sofia Province – partisan Stefan Minev "Anton" (1917–1944)
 Antonovo – Anton Krastev, who died in a battle of 1944
 Asenovgrad – Tsar Ivan Asen II
 Aksakovo – Russian littérateur Ivan Aksakov
 Benkovski, Kardzhali Province – revolutionary Georgi Benkovski
 Blagoevgrad –  Bulgarian Workers' Social Democratic Party founder Dimitar Blagoev
 Botevgrad – Revolutionary and National Hero Hristo Botev
 Bratya Daskalovi – The Daskalovi brothers Dimitar, Ivan and Nikola
 Chervenkovtsi (Veliko Tarnovo) – Valko Chervenkov, Prime Minister of Bulgaria
 Dimitrovgrad – Communist leader and Prime Minister Georgi Dimitrov
 Dimovo – partisan Zhivko (Dimo) Puev
 Dobrich – 14th-century Dobrujan ruler Dobrotitsa
 Dospat – Despot Alexius Slav
 Dulovo, Bulgaria – early medieval Bulgarian Dulo clan
 Elena, Bulgaria – Bulgarian bride Elena
 Elin Pelin – writer Elin Pelin
 General Toshevo – General Stefan Toshev
 Georgi Damyanovo – Georgi Damyanov, President of Bulgaria in 1950 until 1958
 Georgi Dobrevo – Georgi Dobrev (1893–1966), Bulgarian political figure
 Gotse Delchev – revolutionary Gotse Delchev
 Gurkovo – Iosif Gurko, one of Russian commanders in Russo-Turkish War (1877–1878)
 Hadzhidimovo – leftist Internal Macedonian Revolutionary Organization (IMRO) revolutionary Dimo Hadzhidimov
 Isperih – Khan Asparuh of Bulgaria
 Ivaylovgrad – Tsar Ivaylo of Bulgaria
 Kableshkovo (disambiguation) – revolutionary Todor Kableshkov
 Kapitan Andreevo – Bulgarian officer Nikola Kolev Andreev
 Krumovgrad – Khan Krum of Bulgaria
 Kubrat – Khan Kubrat of Bulgaria
 Kyustendil – 14th-century local feudal Constantine Dragaš
 Levski (town) – revolutionary and National Hero Vasil Levski
 Madzharovo – revolutionary Dimitar Madzharov (1882–1949)
 Momchilgrad – medieval Bulgarian ruler Momchil
 Nikola Kozlevo – Bulgarian National Revival revolutionary and writer Nikola Kozlev 
 Omurtag – Khan Omurtag of Bulgaria
 Pavel Banya – St. Pavel (Paul) and Russian Tsar-Liberator's brother Prince Pavel
 Radomir (town) – Gavril Radomir of Bulgaria
 Rakovski – revolutionary Georgi Sava Rakovski
 Roman, Bulgaria – Tsar Roman of Bulgaria
 Samuil (village) – Tsar Samuil of Bulgaria
 Sandanski – revolutionary Yane Sandanski
 Shumen – Bulgarian emperor Simeon the Great
 Simeonovgrad – Tsar Simeon I of Bulgaria
 St. Anastasia Island – Anastasia of Sirmium
 St. Ivan Island – St. John the Baptist
 Stamboliyski – Prime Minister of Bulgaria Aleksandar Stamboliyski
 Stambolovo, Haskovo Province – Prime Minister of Bulgaria Stefan Stambolov
 Stefan Karadzhovo – Bulgarian Revolutionary Stefan Karadzha
 Suvorovo – Alexander Suvorov, one of the famous Russian military commanders
 Tervel – Khan Tervel of Bulgaria
 Thompson – British officer William Frank Thompson 
 Tsar Kaloyan – Tsar Kaloyan of Bulgaria
 Tsarevo – Tsar Boris III of Bulgaria
 Tsenovo, Ruse Province – Influential Svishtov merchant Dimitar Apostolov Tsenov (1852–1932)
 Velingrad – Bulgarian communist revolutionary Vela Peeva
 Yambol – Roman Emperor Diocletian
 Zhivkovo (Sofia) – Georgi Zhivkov (1844–1899), minister of education

Former:
 Borisovgrad was the name of Parvomay – Tsar Boris III of Bulgaria
 Kolarovgrad was the name of Shumen – Vasil Kolarov
 Stalin was the name of Varna – Joseph Stalin
 Stanke Dimitrov was the name of Dupnitsa – revolutionary Stanke Dimitrov
 Tolbukhin was the name of Dobrich – Soviet marshal Fyodor Tolbukhin

Burkina Faso
 Sankara, Burkina Faso – Thomas Sankara, Military, Revolutionary and President of Burkina Faso

Cambodia
 Phnom Penh – said to be named for Lady Penh
 Sihanoukville (city) – King Norodom Sihanouk

Canada

 Abbotsford, British Columbia – Harry Abbott (Canadian Pacific Railway superintendent)
 Abbotsford, Quebec – Rev. Joseph Abbott
 Alberta – Princess Louise Caroline Alberta
 Barkerville, British Columbia – Billy Barker English prospector
 Barrie, Ontario – Sir Robert Barrie or Captain A. Barry
 Bathurst, New Brunswick – Henry Bathurst, 3rd Earl Bathurst
 Brantford, Ontario – Joseph Brant
 Brockville, Ontario and Brock, Ontario – Isaac Brock
 Brooks, Alberta – Noel Edgell Brooks (railway engineer)
 Burnaby, British Columbia – Robert Burnaby
 Charlemagne, Quebec – Romuald-Charlemagne Laurier 
 Charlottetown, Prince Edward Island – Queen Charlotte of Mecklenburg-Strelitz, consort of King George III of the United Kingdom
 Churchill, Manitoba – John Churchill, 1st Duke of Marlborough
 Churchill Falls – Winston Churchill, Prime Minister of United Kingdom
 Collingwood, Ontario – Cuthbert Collingwood, 1st Baron Collingwood
 Dawson City – George Mercer Dawson
 Dollard-des-Ormeaux – Adam Dollard des Ormeaux
 Drummondville, Quebec – Gordon Drummond
 Edmundston, New Brunswick – Edmund Walker Head
 Fredericton, New Brunswick – Prince Frederick, Duke of York
 Halifax – George Montagu-Dunk, 2nd Earl of Halifax
 Hamilton, Ontario – George Hamilton
 Huntsville, Ontario – Captain George Hunt (settler)
 Joliette, Quebec – Barthélemy Joliette
 King George, Saskatoon – George VI of United Kingdom
 Kirkland, Quebec – Charles-Aimé Kirkland, a Canadian politician
 Kirkland Lake, Ontario – Ms. Winnifred Kirkland, secretary at the Ontario Department of Mines
 Kitchener, Ontario – Horatio Kitchener
 Lethbridge, Alberta – William Lethbridge
 Maberly, Ontario – William Maberly
 Markham, Ontario – William Markham
 Mont-Laurier, Quebec – Sir Wilfrid Laurier, Prime Minister of Canada
 Morrisburg, Ontario – James Morris
 Patricia, Alberta – Princess Patricia
 Peterborough, Ontario – Peter Robinson
 Port Alberni, British Columbia – Captain Pere d'Alberní
 Port Hope Simpson – John Hope Simpson, British liberal politician
 Port Moody, British Columbia – Richard Moody, first Lieutenant-Governor of the Colony of British Columbia.
 Prince Albert, Saskatchewan – Prince Albert
 Prince George, British Columbia – King George III
 Prince Rupert, British Columbia – Prince Rupert of the Rhine
 Sackville, New Brunswick - George Germain, 1st Viscount Sackville
 Queen Elizabeth, Saskatoon – Queen Elizabeth The Queen Mother
 Regina, Saskatchewan – Queen Victoria
 Robert-Cliche Regional County Municipality – Robert Cliche, a Quebec politician, writer, lawyer and judge
 Selkirk, Manitoba – Thomas Douglas, 5th Earl of Selkirk
 Sherbrooke, Quebec and Sherbrooke, Nova Scotia – John Coape Sherbrooke
 Sydney, Nova Scotia – Thomas Townshend, Lord Sydney
 Thompson, Manitoba – Dr. John F. Thompson (1881–1968), Inco's chairman
 Timmins, Ontario – Noah Timmins
 Vancouver, British Columbia – Captain George Vancouver, English explorer of Dutch descent (van Coevorden)
 Victoria, British Columbia – Queen Victoria
 Victoriaville, Quebec – Queen Victoria
 Wolfville, Nova Scotia – Elisha DeWolf

Central African Republic
 Barthélemy Boganda Stadium – Barthélemy Boganda, First Prime Minister
 Carnot, Central African Republic – Sadi Carnot, French President
 Possel – Marshal Possel-Deydier, who was killed in combat against Rabih az-Zubayr at Kouno the year before
 Sibut – Adolphe Pierre Sibut

Chad
 Faya-Largeau – French Colonel, Étienne Largeau (1867–1916)

Former:
 Fort Archambault was the name of Sarh – Gustave Archambaud (1872–1899), French topographer
 Fort-Lamy was the name of N'Djamena – Amédée-François Lamy, an army officer

Chile
 Capitán Prat Province – Arturo Prat, naval hero
 Candelario Mancilla – José Candelario Mancilla Uribe (1900–1967), Chilean inhabitant of Lake O'Higgins 
 Cardenal Caro Province – José María Caro Rodríguez, first Cardinal of Chile
 Cochrane – Thomas Cochrane, 10th Earl of Dundonald, captain
 Diego de Almagro, Chile – Diego de Almagro
 Galvarino – Galvarino, Mapuche leader during the War of Arauco
 Gorbea – Andrés Antonio de Gorbea (1792-1852), founder and first dean of the Faculty of Mathematical and Exact Sciences of the University of Chile
 General Lagos – General Pedro Lagos, commander of Chilean troops in the Battle of Arica
 Lautaro – Lautaro, Mapuche leader during the War of Arauco
 Molina, Chile – Juan Ignacio Molina, Jesuit
 Osorno, Chile – Ambrosio O'Higgins, founder and Marquis of Osorno
 Padre José Fernandez Perez (Puerto Montt) - José Fernandez Perez (1919-2000), spanish priest
 Padre Hurtado – Saint Alberto Hurtado
 Pedro Aguirre Cerda, Chile – Pedro Aguirre Cerda, President
 Puerto Ingeniero Ibáñez – Carlos Ibáñez del Campo, President
 Puerto Montt – Manuel Montt, President
 Puerto Saavedra – Cornelio Saavedra Rodríguez, military figure who played a major role in the Occupation of the Araucanía
 Puerto Varas – Antonio Varas, minister of the interior
 Puerto Williams – Juan Williams Rebolledo, Chilean admiral
 San Fernando – Saint Ferdinand
 San Pedro de Atacama – Saint Peter
 Santiago – James, son of Zebedee (Saint James)
 Teodoro Schmidt – Teodoro Schmidt
 Valdivia – Pedro de Valdivia, conqueror of Chile
 Vicuña, Chile – Colonel Joaquín Vicuña Larraín, founder of a city
 Villa Frei (Coyhaique) – Eduardo Frei Montalva, President
 Villa O'Higgins – Bernardo O'Higgins, libertador of Chile

China
 Gensi Township – Yang Gensi, Chinese military hero
 Huanghua - Huang Hua, Chinese communist revolutionary
 Jingyu, Jilin – General Yang Jingyu
 Leifeng Subdistrict – Lei Feng, Chinese hero
 Maoming – Chinese scholar and doctor Pan Maoming
 Qinhuangdao – Qin Shi Huang, First emperor of China
 Tong Linge Road, Zhao Dengyu Road, Zhang Zizhong Road – Tong Linge, Zhao Dengyu, Zhang Zizhong, martyrs in the Second Sino-Japanese War
 Yingjun – Liu Yingjun (1945–1966), a Chinese military hero
 Zhidan County – Liu Zhidan, military strategist and high-ranking leader of the Chinese Workers' and Peasants' Red Army
 Zhongshan, Guangdong – Dr. Sun Yat-sen, President of the Republic of China
 Zichang County – Xie Zichang (1897–1935), Communist martyr
 Zuoquan County – Zuo Quan, a general in the Red Army during the Chinese revolution

Colombia

Democratic Republic of the Congo
 Cité Maman Mobutu (Kinshasa) – Marie-Antoinette Mobutu (1941–1977), First Lady of the Democratic Republic of the Congo
 Cité Mzee Laurent Désiré Kabila (Kinshasa) – Laurent-Désiré Kabila, President
 Kasa-Vubu, Kinshasa - Joseph Kasa-Vubu
 Lumumba (Lodja) – Patrice Lumumba, First Prime Minister

Former:

 Albertville was the name of Kalemie – Albert I of Belgium
 Coquilhatville was the name of Mbandaka – Camille-Aimé Coquilhat
 Élisabethville was the name of Lubumbashi – Queen Elizabeth of Belgium
 Jadotville was the name of Likasi – Jean Jadot
 Léopoldville was the name of Kinshasa – Leopold II of Belgium
 Ponthierville was the name of Ubundu – Pierre Ponthier
 Stanleyville was the name of Kisangani – Henry Morton Stanley

Republic of the Congo
 Brazzaville – Pierre Savorgnan de Brazza
 Lumumba (Point Noire) – Patrice Lumumba

Costa Rica

 Abangares (canton) – Cacique Avancari
 Acosta (canton) – Tomás de Acosta y Hurtado de Mendoza (1747–1821), Governor of Province of Costa Rica
 Alfaro (Alajuela) – Juan Alfaro Ruiz (1810–1856), Costa Rican military and hero of the Filibuster war
 Alvarado (canton) – Presbyter Joaquin Alvarado Ruiz (d.1890)
 Anselmo Llorente District and Llorente District – Anselmo Llorente y La Fuente (1800–1871), Costa Rican Bishop
 Aserrí (canton) – Cacique Aczarri
 Bagaces – Cacique Bagatzi
 Barva – Cacique Barvak
 Biolley (Puntarenas) – Paul Biolley (1862–1908), Swiss educator and naturalist
 Bolívar District, Grecia - Simon Bolivar
 Cañas (canton) - José María Cañas, Salvadoran military figure
 Carmona District, Nandayure - José Daniel Carmona Briceño (1869-1929)
 Carrillo (canton) – Braulio Carrillo Colina, a head of state of Costa Rica
 Cervantes District – Juan de Cervantes
 Ciudad Cortés – León Cortés Castro. President of Costa Rica
 Ciudad Neily – Ricardo Neily Jop (1912–2000), a Lebanese citizen and founder of a city
 Curridabat – Cacique Corriava
 Daniel Oduber (Liberia) – Daniel Oduber Quirós
 Dota (canton) – Cacique Ota
 El Guarco (canton) – Cacique El Guarco
 Flores (canton) – Don Juan J.Flores Umaña (1843–1903), a Costa Rican physician
 Garcia Flamenco (Guanacaste) – Marcelino Garcia Flamenco (1888–1919), a Salvadoran teacher
 Goicoechea (canton) – Fray José Antonio de Liendo y Goicoechea
 Gutiérrez Braun District – Hernán Gutiérrez Braun (1902–1979), Costa Rican engineer
 Heredia, Costa Rica – Alonso Fernández de Heredia, a President of the Real Audiencia of Guatemala
 Jiménez (canton) – Jesús Jiménez Zamora President of Costa Rica
 León Cortés (canton) – León Cortés Castro
 Llano Brenes (Alajuela) - Alberto Manuel Brenes (1870-1948)
 Mayorga de Liberia - Francisco Mayorga Rivas (1864-1940)
 Montes de Oca (canton) – Don Faustino Montes de Oca (1860–1902), a former congressional representative from the area
 Montezuma, Costa Rica – Moctezuma II, an Aztec Emperor
 Mora (canton) – Juan Rafael Mora Porras and Juan Mora Fernández
 Moravia (canton) – Juan Rafael Mora Porras, President of Costa Rica and National Hero
 Morazan (Alajuela), Morazan (San Jose) and Morazan (Limon) – Francisco Morazan
 Naranjito de Aguirre – Rolando Aguirre Lobo (1918–1948)
 Oreamuno (canton) – Francisco María Oreamuno Bonilla, President of Costa Rica
 Orlich (Alajuela) - Francisco Orlich Bolmarcich
 Orotina - Gurutina, indigenous king of the chorotega ethnic 
 Osa (canton) – Cacique Osa
 Pérez Zeledón (canton) – Pedro Perez Zeledon (1854–1930), Jurist and diplomat
 Pittier District – Henri François Pittier
 Pococí (canton) – Cacique Pococi
 Puerto Jiménez and Jiménez, Pococí – Ricardo Jiménez Oreamuno President of Costa Rica
 Puerto Soley (Guanacaste) - Tomás Soley Güell (1875-1943), Costa Rican economist
 Puerto Thiel (Guanacaste) - Monseñor Bernardo Augusto Thiel (1850-1901)
 Puerto Vargas (Limon) - Balvanero Vargas Molina (1833-1905), Governor of Limon
 Quesada, San Carlos – Napoleon Quesada Salazar (1873–1937), Poet
 Rincón Ulate (Sarchi) – Otilio Ulate Blanco
 Rivas, Costa Rica – Domingo Rivas Salvatierra (1836–1900)
 Rodríguez District - Herminio de Jesus Rodriguez Gonzalez (1892-1960)
 Santa Bárbara de Heredia – Saint Barbara
 Santa Ana (canton) – Saint Anne
 San Carlos (canton) – Saint Charles Borromeo
 Santo Domingo (canton), Costa Rica – Saint Dominic
 San Isidro (canton) – Saint Isidro Labrador
 San Isidro de El General - Saint Isidro Labrador and General Bernardo Soto Alfaro, President of Costa Rica
 San José, Costa Rica – Saint Joseph
 San Mateo de Alajuela – Saint Matthew
 San Pablo (canton) – Saint Paul of Tarsus
 San Rafael (canton) – Saint Raphael
 San Ramón, Costa Rica – Saint Raymond Nonnatus or Ramon Salas Sandoval (1838-1902) and Ramon Rodriguez Solorzano (1818-1893), two prominent figures in San Ramon
 San Vito (Costa Rica) - Saint Vitus or Vito Sansonetti (1916-1999), Italian marine and founder of San Vito de Java
 Valverde (San Ramon) – Carlos Luis Valverde (1903–1948), Costa Rican physician and revolutionary 
 Vázquez de Coronado (canton) – Conquistador Juan Vázquez de Coronado
 Volio District - Julián Volio Llorente

Former:

 Aguirre (now Quepos) – Rolando Aguirre Lobo: a hero of Revolution of 1948
 Alfaro Ruiz (now Zarcero) – Colonel Juan Alfaro Ruiz, a hero of the National Campaign of 1856
 Valverde Vega (now Sarchí) – Dr. Carlos Luis Valverde Vega, a physician and founder of the Unión Médica Nacional (National Medical Union).

Croatia
 Dinko Simunovic (Zagreb) – Dinko Simunovic, Croatian writer
 Ernestinovo – Mrs. Ernestina Klein
 Eugen Kvaternik (Zagreb) – Eugen Kvaternik, Croatian nationalist politician
 Ferdinandovac – Ferdinand I of Austria, President of the German Confederation, King of Hungary
 Generalski Stol – General Vuk Krsto Frankopan
 Ivan Mazuranic (Zagreb) – Ivan Mazuranic, Croatian poet, lawyer and politician
 Karlovac – King Charles II of Austria
 Maksimir – Maksimilijan Vrhovac, bishop of Zagreb
 Ošljak – Known in Italian and historical documents as Calugerà or Calogerà, after the Calogerà family who owned it
 Oton Zupancic (Zagreb) – Oton Zupancic, Slovene poet
 Tomislavovac – Tomislav of Yugoslavia

Former:
 Kardeljevo was the name of Ploče from 1950 through 1954 and from 1980 through 1990 – Edvard Kardelj
 Titova Korenica was the name of Korenica from 1945 through 1997 – Josip Broz Tito

Cuba
 Bartolomé Masó, Cuba – Bartolomé Masó, a Cuban patriot and President of Cuba
 Briones Montoto (Cuba) – Antonio Briones Montoto (1940–1967), Cuban revolutionary
 Calixto García, Cuba – Calixto García Iñiguez, an independence war hero
 Camilo Cienfuegos (Santa Cruz del Norte) – Camilo Cienfuegos, Cuban revolutionary
 Cárdenas, Cuba – Mateo de Cárdenas y Vélez de Guevara
 Central José Smith Comas (Cárdenas) – José Smith Comas (1932–1956)
 Cespedes, Cuba – Carlos Manuel de Céspedes, Father of the Cuban Fatherland and first President of Cuba
 Cienfuegos – José Cienfuegos Jovellanos, Captain General of Cuba
 Ciro Redondo – Ciro Redondo, a Cuban revolutionary
 Colón, Cuba – Christopher Columbus
 Emilio Córdova (Encrucijada) – Emilio Córdova Garcia (1938–1958)
 Frank País, Cuba – revolutionary Frank País
 Héctor Molina (San Nicolás) – Héctor Molina Riaño (1922–1958)
 Hermanos Saíz (San Juan y Martínez) – The Saiz Brothers who died in action in 1957
 Heriberto Orellanes (La Sierpe) – Heriberto Felipe Orellana (1926–1959)
 Holguín – Captain García Holguín, Spanish military officer
 Jesús Menéndez – Cuban trade unionist Jesús Menéndez Larrondo
 Juan Gualberto Gómez (Matanzas) – Juan Gualberto Gómez
 Loynaz Hechavarría (Holguin) – Loynaz Hechavarría Cordovés (1911–1956)
 Manuel Sanguily (Ciego de Avila) – Manuel Sanguily (1848–1925)
 Mariel, Cuba – Cacique Marien
 Martí, Cuba – Cuban Independence Hero José Martí
 Niceto Pérez – Cuban peasant Niceto Perez Garcia
 Obdulio Morales (Sanctis Spiritus) - Obdulio Morales (1910-1981), cuban compositor
 Pablo de la Torriente Brau (Bahía Honda) – Pablo de la Torriente Brau (1901–1936)
 Pedro Betancourt – Pedro Betancourt Dávalos
 Piti Fajardo (Trinidad) – Manuel "Piti" Fajardo (1930–1960)
 Ramon Balboa (Cienfuegos) – Ramon Balboa Monzon (1939–1958)
 Raúl Hernández Vidal (San Antonio de los Baños) – Raúl Hernández Vidal (1948–1978), Cuban pilot
 Reynold García (Calimete) –  Reynold García García (1922–1956)
 Sabino Hernández (Santo Domingo) – Sabino Hernandez Casal (died in 1959)
 Sandino, Cuba – Nicaraguan revolutionary Augusto César Sandino
 Santiago de Cuba – James, son of Zebedee
 Silvio Caro (Bahía Honda) – Silvio Nestor Caro (1943–1966)

Curaçao
 Willemstad – William II, Prince of Orange or his son William III of England

Cyprus
 Agios Athanasios, Cyprus – Athanasius of Alexandria
 Ayios Dhometios – Saint Dometius of Persia
 Ethnomártyras Kyprianós (Strovolos) – Kyprianos of Cyprus
 Makarios (Kato Polemidia) – Makarios III
 Paphos – Paphos, daughter of Pygmalion (mythology)

Czech Republic
 Adamov (Blansko District) – Adam Josef, Prince of Liechtenstein, ironworks owner
 Alojzov – Alois I, Prince of Liechtenstein
 Barrandov, Prague – Joachim Barrande
 Františkovy Lázně – Francis II, Holy Roman Emperor
 Golčův Jeníkov – Martin Maxmillian Goltz, general of the Habsburg army
 Havlíčkův Brod – Karel Havlíček Borovský
 Jáchymov – St. Joachim
 Jindřichův Hradec – Jindřich z Hradce, owner of the castle in the town
 Fortress Josefov and Josefov (Prague) – Joseph II, Holy Roman Emperor
 Halasovo Kunštátsko – František Halas
 Karlín – Caroline Augusta of Bavaria
 Karlovy Vary – Charles IV, Holy Roman Emperor
 Karlštejn Castle and village – Charles IV, Holy Roman Emperor
 Mladá Boleslav – Boleslaus II of Bohemia
 Špindlerův Mlýn – Spindler, a miller
 Švermova (Bruntál) – Jan Šverma
 Stará Boleslav – Boleslaus I of Bohemia
 Terezín – Empress Maria Theresa of Austria
 Vítkov – Vítek z Kravař
 Žižkov – Jan Žižka

Former:
 Gottwaldov was the name of Zlín from 1948 through 1990 – Klement Gottwald

Denmark
 Albertslund – Albert de Rault de Ramsault de Tortonval (1778–1855), a French noble
 Augustenborg – Auguste, duchess of Schleswig-Holstein
 Carlsberg (district) – Carl Jacobsen, a Danish brewer, art collector and philanthropist
 Charlottenlund – Princess Charlotte Amalie of Denmark
 Christiania – Christian IV of Denmark
 Christiansfeld – Christian VII of Denmark
 Christianshavn – Christian IV of Denmark
 Dronninglund –  Queen Charlotte Amalie
 Fredericia – King Frederick III of Denmark
 Frederiks – King Frederick VI of Denmark
 Frederiksberg – King Frederick IV of Denmark
 Frederikshavn – King Frederick VI of Denmark
 Frederikssund – Frederick III of Denmark
 Frederiksværk – King Frederick V of Denmark
 Karlslunde – Kalf Skurfa
 Liseleje – Elisabeth (Lise) Classen
 Mariager – Blessed Virgin Mary
 Marielyst – Marie Kørgensen

In Greenland:
 Christianshåb (Inuit: Qasigiannguit) – King Christian VI of Denmark
 Frederikshåb (Inuit: Paamiut) – King Frederick V of Denmark
 Jakobshavn (Inuit: Ilulissat) – Jakob Severin, a fur trader

In Bornholm:
 Gudhjem – God

Dominica
 Salisbury, Dominica – Robert Gascoyne-Cecil, 3rd Marquess of Salisbury
 Scotts Head, Dominica – Colonel George Scott (British Army officer)

Dominican Republic
 Cabral, Dominican Republic – José María Cabral
 Cabrera, María Trinidad Sánchez – General Jose Cabrera (d.1884), hero of the Dominican Restoration
 Castillo, Dominican Republic – General Manuel María Castillo, hero of the Dominican Restoration
 Cayetano Germosén – a Dominican patriot and martyr
 Ciudad Juan Bosch (Santo Domingo) – Juan Bosch (politician), Dominican President
 Colonia Libertador (Dajabon) – Rafael Trujillo (libertator)
 Comendador, Dominican Republic – Nicolás de Ovando y Cáceres
 Duarte Province – Juan Pablo Duarte, founder of the Dominican Republic
 Duvergé – General Antonio Duvergé, Dominican independence hero
 Espaillat Province – Ulises Francisco Espaillat, 19th-century author and President
 Emma Balaguer Viuda Vallejo (Azua) – Emma Balaguer Vallejo (1911–1992), Joaquin Balaguer's sister
 Elupina Cordero de Las Cañitas (Hato Mayor) – Elupina Cordero (1892–1939), a Dominican catholic religious
 Gaspar Hernández – Gaspar Hernandez, a famous Dominican Priest in the war of independence from Haiti
 Galván, Dominican Republic – Manuel de Jesús Galván (1834–1910), Dominican writer
 Hermanas Mirabal Province – Mirabal sisters
 Hostos – Eugenio María de Hostos
 Imbert, Dominican Republic – José María Imbert
 Jimaní – Cacique Ximani
 Jose Francisco Pena Gomez (Pedernales) – Jose Francisco Pena Gomez, Dominican lawyer and politician
 Juan de Herrera, Dominican Republic – Juan de Herrera (Spanish farmer)
 Juan Rodríguez (La Vega) – General Juan Rodriguez Garcia (1886–1960), Dominican military and politician
 Loma de Cabrera and Cabrera, María Trinidad Sánchez – José Cabrera Gómez (1810–1884), Dominican independence hero
 Las Matas de Farfán – Bartolome Farfan de los Godos, Spanish merchant
 Luperón – Gregorio Luperón, Dominican general and statesman
 Mamá Tingó (Monte Plata) – Mamá Tingó, Dominican activist leader
 María Trinidad Sánchez Province – María Trinidad Sánchez, a female soldier in the wars of independence
 Mella, Independencia – Matías Ramón Mella
 Monseñor Nouel Province – Monseñor Dr. Adolfo Alejandro Nouel y Bobadilla, Archbishop of Santo Domingo and President 
 Padre Las Casas, Dominican Republic – Bartolome de las Casas
 Pedro Brand – Peter Dorse Brand, a Californian miner
 Pedro Santana, Dominican Republic – Pedro Santana, first President of Dominican Republic
 Pepillo Salcedo, Dominican Republic – General José Antonio Salcedo
 Pimentel, Dominican Republic – Pedro Antonio Pimentel
 Presidente Don Antonio Guzmán Fernández (Duarte) – Antonio Guzman Fernandez, President of the Republic
 Ramón Santana – twin brother of Pedro Santana
 Salcedo, Dominican Republic – Francisco Antonio Salcedo
 San Antonio de Guerra – Hernando Guerra (founder)
 Sánchez, Dominican Republic – Francisco del Rosario Sánchez
 Sánchez Ramírez Province – Juan Sánchez Ramírez, hero of the Battle of Palo Hincado (1808)
 Santiago Rodríguez Province – Santiago Rodríguez, an officer of the Dominican army in the Dominican War of Independence
 Santo Domingo – Saint Dominic
 Valverde Province – José Desiderio Valverde
 Vicente Noble – General Vicente Noble, Dominican military
 Villa González – Manuel de Jesus Gonzalez Estevez (1862–1912), founder
 Villa Riva – Gregorio Riva (1833–1889), Dominican pioneer
 Villa Tapia – Doroteo Antonio Tapia (1844–1901), Hero of the Dominican Restoration War
 Villa Vásquez – Horacio Vásquez, President of the Dominican Republic

Former:
 Benefactor Province was the name of San Juan Province (Dominican Republic) – Rafael Trujillo
 Ciudad Trujillo was the name of Santo Domingo – Rafael Trujillo
 José Trujillo Valdez Province was the name of Peravia Province – José Trujillo Valdez (1864–1935), Rafael Trujillo's father
 Julia Molina Province was the name of María Trinidad Sánchez Province – Altagracia Julia Molina (1863–1964), Rafael Trujillo's mother
 Pacificador Province was the name of Duarte Province – Ulises Heureaux (Peacemaker)
 San Rafael Province was the name of Elías Piña Province – Rafael Trujillo
 Villa José Trujillo Valdez was the name of Villa Jaragua – José Trujillo Valdez
 Villa Julia Molina was the name of Nagua – Altagracia Julia Molina

East Timor
 Dom Aleixo Administrative Post – Aleixo Corte-Real
 Vila Salazar (Baucau) – António de Oliveira Salazar, a Portuguese statesman

Former:

 Vila Armindo Monteiro was the name of Bobonaro - Armindo Monteiro (1896-1955), Portuguese university professor, businessman, diplomat, and politician		
 Vila Eduardo Marques was the name of Bazartete - Eduardo Marques (1867-1944), Portuguese military and officer
 Vila Filomeno da Câmara was the name of Same, East Timor - Filomeno da Câmara de Melo Cabral (1873-1934), Governor of Portuguese Timor
 Vila General Carmona was the name of Aileu - Oscar Carmona, Portuguese president		
 Vila Salazar was the name of Baucau - António de Oliveira Salazar

Ecuador

Egypt
 Alexandria – Alexander the Great
 El Mahmoudiyah – Muhammad Ali of Egypt
 Faiyum:
 formerly named Arsinoe – Arsinoe II of Egypt
 formerly named Ptolemais Euergetis – Ptolemy III Euergetes
 Ismailia – Isma'il Pasha
 Kafr El Sheikh – Sheikh Talha al-Tilmisani
 Port Fouad – Fuad I of Egypt
 Port Said – Sa'id of Egypt
 Port Tawfik – Tewfik Pasha
 Nasser, Egypt – Egyptian President Gamal Abdel Nasser
 Sadat City – Egyptian President Anwar Sadat
 Saint Catherine, Egypt – Catherine of Alexandria
 Sheikh Zayed City – Zayed bin Sultan Al Nahyan
 Sheikh Zuweid – Sheikh Zuweid commander of the Rashidun Islamic army who fought during the Muslim conquest of Egypt
 Victoria (neighborhood) – Queen Victoria

El Salvador
 Alegría, Usulután – Presbyter José Miguel Alegria (d.1859)
 Aguilares – Manuel Aguilar y Bustamante and his brothers Nicolas and Vicente Aguilar
 Bolívar, La Unión – Simon Bolivar
 Cabañas Department – José Trinidad Cabañas
 Carolina, San Miguel – Charles IV of Spain
 Ciudad Arce – Manuel José Arce, Salvadorian Independence hero
 Ciudad Barrios – General Gerardo Barrios, President of El Salvador
 Col. Borja Moran (Ahuachapan) – Dr. Alfonso Borja Moran (1897–1986), Salvadorian deputy
 Col Francisco Gavidia (San Miguel) – Francisco Gavidia, Salvadorian writer
 Col. Isidro Menendez (San Salvador) – Isidro Menendez (1795–1858)
 Colón, La Libertad – Christopher Columbus
 Comunidad Farabundo Martí (Santa Ana) – Farabundo Martí, Salvadorian revolutionary
 Delgado, San Salvador – José Matías Delgado, Salvadorian Independence hero
 La Reina, Chalatenango – Guatemalan resident, Maria Reina
 Morazán Department – Francisco Morazán
 Santa Ana, El Salvador – Saint Anne
 Santiago de María – Santiago González (politician), President of El Salvador with his daughter Maria Concepcion Gonzalez Fortis (1872–1943)
 San Antonio Pajonal – Antonio Gutiérrez y Ulloa
 San Cayetano Istepeque – Dr. Cayetano Molina, President of El Salvador
 San Fernando, Chalatenango – King Ferdinand VII of Spain
 San Fernando, Morazán –  Ferdinand III of Castile
 San Francisco Menéndez – Francisco Menéndez, President of El Salvador
 San Francisco Morazán – Francisco Morazán
 San Gerardo – Gerardo Barrios, President of El Salvador
 San Ildefonso, San Vicente – Saint Ildephonsus of Toledo
 San Jorge, San Miguel – Jorge Meléndez, President of El Salvador
 San Luis La Herradura - Luis Chávez y González
 San Rafael, San Miguel – Dr. Rafael Zaldivar, President of El Salvador
 San Rafael Cedros – Dr. Rafael Zaldivar
 San Rafael Obrajuelo – Dr. Rafael Zaldivar
 San Ramón, Cuscatlán – Presbyter Ramon Garcia
 San Salvador, El Salvador – Jesus (the Christian Savior)
 San Vicente, El Salvador – Saint Vincent of Saragossa
 Segundo Montes, Morazán – Segundo Montes, a Jesuit priest and scholar at the Universidad Centroamericana "José Simeón Cañas" 
 Victoria, Cabañas – Guadalupe Victoria, first President of Mexico
 Zaragoza, La Libertad – Emperor Caesar Augustus

Equatorial Guinea
 Bioko – Adolfo Bioko, son of the King Möókáta
 Luba, Equatorial Guinea – Botuku Luba, who led a revolt against the Spanish in 1910
 Malabo – Malabo Lopelo Melaka
 Moka, Equatorial Guinea –  King Möókáta (d.1898)

Estonia
 Anna – Saint Anne
 Järva-Jaani – John the Baptist
 Juhkentali – Lorenz Jauch, local landowner
 Kadriorg – Catherine I of Russia
 Karlova – Carl Gustav von Krüdener, local landowner
 Katleri – the Kattler family, local landowners
 Klooga and Kloogaranna – the Klugen noble family, local landowners
 Kolga-Jaani – John the Evangelist
 Kristiine – Christina, Queen of Sweden
 Maarja-Magdaleena – Mary Magdalene
 Maarjamäe – Marie, wife and/or daughter of Anatol Orlov-Davydov
 Madise – Saint Matthias
 Manilaid and Manija – Magnus, Duke of Holstein
 Peetri – Peter Peter, an 18th-century local farmer
 Pildiküla – Feliks Pilt (1906–1979), founder of a local housing estate 
 Pirita – Bridget of Sweden
 Suure-Jaani – John the Evangelist
 Tondi and Tondiraba – Jobst Dunte, Tallinn Burgermeister
 Tartu – possibly after Tharapita, God of Estonian mythology
 Valga (Latvian: Valka) – possibly after the de Walko (de Walco) family, local landowners

Former:
 Harju-Jaani was the name of Raasiku – John the Baptist
 Kingissepa was the name of Kuressaare – Viktor Kingissepp, Estonian revolutionary and communist

Eswatini (Swaziland)
 Mbabane –  Chief Mbabane Kunene
 Piggs Peak – William Pigg (Early resident)

Ethiopia
 Debre Marqos – Saint Mark the Evangelist
 Habete Giorgis (Addis Adeba) – Habte Giyorgis Dinagde, Ethiopian military commander
 Lalibela – Gebre Mesqel Lalibela, Emperor of Ethiopia
 Ras Makonnen (Addis Adeba) – Haile Selassie (Ras Tafari Makonnen), Emperor of Ethiopia
 Sheikh Hussein – Sheikh Hussein (saint), a 13th-century Somali Muslim proselytizer
 Waliso – son of Liban, Waliso, an Oromo clan

Falkland Islands
 Darwin – Charles Darwin
 Stanley – Edward Smith-Stanley, 14th Earl of Derby
 Weddell Island – James Weddell
 Keppel Island – Augustus Keppel, 1st Viscount Keppel
 Saunders Island – Charles Saunders (Royal Navy officer)

Finland
 Brahestad (Finnish: Raahe) – Peter Brahe, Governor-General of Finland
 Fredrikshamn (Finnish: Hamina) – King Frederick I of Sweden
 Hermanni (Helsinki) (Swedish: Hermanstad) – Herman Standertskjöld-Nordenstam (1854–1934)
 Jakobstad (Finnish: Pietarsaari) – Jacob De la Gardie (The city was founded by his widow – Ebba Brahe)
 Kaarina (Swedish: Sankt Karins) – Catherine of Alexandria
 Kristinestad (Finnish: Kristiinankaupunki) – Queen Christina of Sweden
 Loviisa (Swedish: Lovisa) – Lovisa Ulrika, Queen of Sweden
 Mariehamn (Finnish: Maarianhamina) – Empress Maria Alexandrovna of Russia
 Mikkeli (Swedish: Sankt Michel) – Archangel Michael
 Ullanlinna (Swedish: Ulrikasborg) – Ulrika Eleonora, Queen of Sweden
 Vaasa (Swedish: Vasa) – King Gustav I of Sweden

France

 Albertville – Charles Albert of Sardinia
 Apatou - Apatou (captain)
 Carla-Bayle – Pierre Bayle (1647–1706), philosopher and writer
 Charleville-sous-Bois – Charles III, Duke of Lorraine
 Châtillon-Coligny – Gaspard de Coligny
 Crillon-le-Brave (the brave) – Louis des Balbes de Berton de Crillon
 Decazeville – Élie, duc Decazes, Prime Minister
 Descartes – René Descartes
 Elisabethville (Yvelines) - Elisabeth of Bavaria, Queen of the Belgians
 Ferney-Voltaire – Voltaire
 Flavigny-sur-Ozerain – possibly named after a Roman general Flavius
 Frédéric-Fontaine – named after Frederick I, Duke of Württemberg
 Grenoble – Roman Emperor Gratian
 Guisanbourg - Jean Samuel Guisan
 La Louptière-Thénard – Louis Jacques Thénard
 Mont-Louis – Louis XIV of France
 Papaïchton-Pompidouville – Georges Pompidou, President of France
 Place Léon-Blum (Paris) – Léon Blum, a French socialist politician
 Quartier De Gaulle (Cayenne) - Charles de Gaulle
 Régina – Louis Athanase Theophane Régina (1868–1922)
 Saint-Amans-Soult – Jean-de-Dieu Soult, Prime Minister
 Saint-Laurent-du-Maroni – Auguste Baudin, Governor of French Guiana
 Saint-Léger-Vauban – Vauban
 Saint-Louis, Haut-Rhin – Louis XIV of France
 Vendays-Montalivet – Jean-Pierre Bachasson, comte de Montalivet

Gabon
 Bongoville – Omar Bongo, President of Gabon
 Lastoursville – François Rigail de Lastours
 Port-Gentil – Émile Gentil

Germany

 Augsburg (state of Bavaria) – Roman Caesar Augustus
 Brunswick (state of Lower Saxony) – Bruno, Duke of Saxony
 Charlottenburg (state of Berlin) – Princess Sophia Charlotte of Hanover, queen consort of King Frederick I of Prussia (est. 13th century, incorporated into Berlin on 1 October 1920)
Claudian colony and sacrificial altar of the Agrippinensians)
 Constance (state of Baden-Württemberg) – Roman Emperor Constantius Chlorus
 Friedrichstadt (state of Berlin) – King Frederick I of Prussia (est. 1688, incorporated into Berlin on 1 January 1710)
 Hildesheim (state of Lower Saxony) – farmer Hildwin (landowner in the 10th century)
 Karlsruhe (state of Baden-Württemberg) – Margrave Charles III William, Margrave of Baden-Durlach
 Leverkusen (state of North Rhine-Westphalia) – pharmacist Carl Leverkus
 Ludwigsburg (state of Baden-Württemberg) – Eberhard Ludwig, Duke of Württemberg
 Ludwigshafen upon Rhine (state of Rhineland-Palatinate) – King Louis I of Bavaria
 Saarlouis (state of Saarland) – King Louis XIV of France
 Sankt Pauli (state of Hamburg) – (Saul) Paul of Tarsos
 Trier (state of Rhineland-Palatinate) – Augustus (lit. City of Augustus in the lands of the Treveri people)
 Wilhelmshaven (state of Lower Saxony) – King William I of Prussia, later also German Emperor (lit. William's harbour)

Former:
 Karl-Marx-Stadt (state of Saxony) was the name of Chemnitz – Karl Marx
 Stalinstadt (state of Brandenburg) was the name of Eisenhüttenstadt – Joseph Stalin

Georgia

 Agmashenebeli (Batumi) – David IV of Georgia
 Andriatsminda (Akhaltsikhe) – Saint Andrew
 Asatiani Settlement (Kutaisi) - Lado Asatiani, Georgian poet
 Atarbekovka (Abkhazia) – Georgi Atarbekov
 Bagrationi (Batumi) – Pyotr Bagration
 Chavchavadze Settlement (Kutaisi) - Ilia Chavchavadze
 Dedoplistsqaro, Tamariani (Lagodekhi) and Tamarisi – Queen Tamar of Georgia
 Eliatsminda (Akhaltsikhe) – Saint Elijah
 Filippovka (Akhalkalaki) – Filipp Makaradze, President of Georgia during the soviet era
 Gabashvili Hill (Kutaisi) - Revaz Gabashvili, Georgian writer and politician
 Georgiashvili (Tetritskaro) – Arsen Georgiashvili (1881–1906)
 Giorgitsminda (Sagarejo) – Saint George
 Iliatsminda (Signagi) - Ilia Chavchavadze
 Javakhishvili (Batumi) – Ivane Javakhishvili, one of the founding fathers of the Tbilisi State University 
 Kalinino (Gardabani) – Mikhail Kalinin
 Kazbegi Municipality – Alexander Kazbegi, a Georgian writer
 Khimshiashvili (Batumi) – Sherip Khimshiashvili
 Kirov (Zugdidi), Kirovka (Marneuli) – Sergey Kirov
 Leselidze (town) – General Konstantin Leselidze, a Georgian Colonel-General and National hero 
 Mikeltsminda (Akhaltsikhe) – Saint Michael
 Mtskheta – Mtskhetos, epic hero of Georgian mythology
 Myasnikiani (Akhalkalaki) – Aleksandr Myasnikyan, first Communist President of Armenia
 Nikoloz Baratashvili district (Rustavi) - Nikoloz Baratashvili
 Nikortsminda – Saint Nicholas
 Ninoshvili (Guria) and Ninoshvili (Samtredia) – Egnate Ninoshvili, a Georgian writer
 Ninotsminda – Saint Nino, an Equal to the Apostles and the Enlightener of Georgia
 Nutsubidze Plato (Tbilisi) – Shalva Nutsubidze
 Pirosmani (Dedoplistskaro) - Niko Pirosmani
 Rustaveli (Batumi) – Shota Rustaveli
 Saakadze (Gardabani) – Giorgi Saakadze, a Georgian politician and military commander
 Stalinisubani (Kobuleti) – Joseph Stalin
 Stepantsminda – Saint Stephen or a Georgian Orthodox monk named Stephan
 Shaumiani – Stepan Shahumyan, a Georgian revolutionary 
 Shaumyanovka (Abkhazia) – Stepan Shahumyan
 Tamar (Batumi) – Queen Tamar of Georgia
 Tsereteli (Marneuli) - Akaki Tsereteli, Georgian poet
 Vakhtangisi (Gardabani) – King Vakhtang I of Iberia
 Vazha-Pshavela (Tbilisi) – Vazha-Pshavela, Georgian writer
 Vorontsovi (Tbilisi) - Mikhail Semyonovich Vorontsov
 Zhdanovakani (Ninotsminda) – Andrey Zhdanov
 Zhiuli Shartava district (Rustavi) - Zhiuli Shartava

Former:
 Gegechkori was the name of Martvili – Sasha Gegechkori
 Kazbegi was the name of Stepantsminda – Alexander Kazbegi
 Leningori was the name of Akhalgori – Vladimir Lenin
 Luxemburg was the name of Bolnisi – Rosa Luxemburg
 Macharadze was the name of Ozurgeti – Filipp Makaradze
 Mayakovsky was the name of Baghdati – Vladimir Mayakovsky
 Orjonikidze was the name of Kharagauli – Sergo Ordzhonikidze
 Stalinsi was the name of Khashuri – Joseph Stalin
 Tskhakaya was the name of Senaki – Mikhail Tskhakaya (1865–1950)
 Tsulukidze was the name of Khoni – Alexander Tsulukidze

Ghana
 Christiansborg – King Christian IV of Denmark
 Gwolu – Gwollu (or Gbollu) Koro Limann
 Kofi Pare – Kofi Pare, a migrant cocoa farmer
 Queen Anne's Point – Anne, Queen of Great Britain
 Techiman – Nana Takyi Firi

Greece

 Alexandreia, Greece – Alexander the Great
 Alexandroupoli – King Alexander of Greece
 Aristotelis (municipality) – Aristotle, ancient philosopher
 Athens – Athena
 Dimitrios Ypsilantis (municipality) – Demetrius Ypsilanti, a 19th-century leader of the Greek struggle for independence
 Dionysos, Greece – Dionysus, god of the grape harvest, winemaking and wine, of ritual madness, fertility
 Emmanouil Pappas (municipality) – Emmanouil Pappas, leader in the Greek War of Independence
 Filippoi – Philip II of Macedon
 Georgios Karaiskakis (municipality) – Georgios Karaiskakis, a leader of the Greek War of Independence
 Glaraki – George Glarakis (1789–1855)
 Gypareika (Athens) – Pavlos Gyparis, Greek army officer
 Gyzi – Nikolaos Gyzis
 Heraklion – Heracles
 Ion Dragoumis (municipality) – Ion Dragoumis, Greek diplomat and protagonist of the Macedonian Struggle
 Kountouriotika – President of Greece Pavlos Kountouriotis 
 Kypriadou – Epameinondas Kypriadis (1888–1958)
 Ladopoulou, Patras – Evangelos G. Ladopoulos (1883–1966)
 Makrygianni, Athens – Yannis Makriyannis
 Megas Alexandros, Pella – Alexander the Great
 Nafplion – Nauplius
 Nikiforos Fokas – 10th century Byzantine Emperor Nikephoros II Phokas
 Nikolaos Skoufas (municipality) – Nikolaos Skoufas, a leader of the Greek independence movement
 Nikos Kazantzakis (municipality) – Nikos Kazantzakis, Greek writer
 Orestiada – Orestes
 Pavlos Melas (municipality) – Pavlos Melas, a Greek hero of Macedonian struggle
 Probonas – Dimitrios Probonas (1874–1949)
 Ptolemaida – Ptolemy I Soter
 Pythagoreio – Pythagoras
 Santorini – Saint Irene
 Skagiopouleio – Panagiotis Skagiopoulos
 Theodoros Ziakas (municipality) – Theodoros Ziakas, a 19th-century leader of the Greek struggle for independence
 Thessaloniki – Thessalonike, sister of Alexander the Great
 Traianoupoli – Roman emperor Trajan
 Vironas – Lord Byron, English poet and writer, National hero of Greece

Grenada
 Grenville, Grenada – George Grenville, Prime Minister of United Kingdom
 Victoria, Grenada – Queen Victoria

Guatemala

 Aguilar Batres (Zacapa) – Raúl Aguilar Batres, Guatemalan civil engineer
 Aparicio (Suchitepequez) – Francisca Aparicio de Barrios, First lady of Guatemala
 Asentamiento Mario Alioto (Guatemala) – Mario Alioto Lopez Sanchez (1973–1994), Guatemalan student who was killed during a protest
 Barberena – Lic. Jose Barberena, Guatemalan secretarian under President Justo Rufino Barrios
 Barrancas de Gálvez (San Marcos) - Mariano Galvez
 Cabañas, Zacapa – José Trinidad Cabañas, a Honduran Politician
 Ciudad Tecun Uman, San Marcos – Cacique Tecun Uman
 Ciudad Pedro de Alvarado (Jutiapa) – Pedro de Alvarado
 Colomba – María Colomba Barillas Robles (1874–1975), daughter of Manuel Barillas
 Col. Martinez de Lejarza (Guatemala) - Juan José Martínez de Lejarza (1785-1824)
 Col. Miguel Angel Asturias (Quetzaltenango) – Miguel Angel Asturias, Guatemalan diplomatic and writer
 Col. Monseñor Gerardi (Guatemala) - Monseñor Juan José Gerardi Conedera
 Col. Perez Guisasola (Guatemala) - Roberto Perez Guisasola (1918-1986)
 Col. Ulises Rojas (Guatemala) - Dr. Ulises Rojas (1881-1959), botanist
 Comunidad Hermogenes Lopez (Chimaltenango) – Hermógenes López Coarchita
 Cooperativa Mario Mendez (Peten) – Mario Mendez Montenegro (1910–1965), political leader
 Chicacao – Francisco Chicajau, indigenous villager
 Fraijanes – Two Missioners Juan Milán y Juan Álvarez
 Francisco Vela (Retahuleu) – Ing. Francisco Vela (1859–1909), Guatemalan cartographer
 Fray Bartolomé de las Casas – 15th-century Spanish priest, bishop, and writer Bartolomé de Las Casas
 Flores, El Petén – Dr. Cirlio Flores Estrada, a Guatemalan physician
 Flores Costa Cuca – Jose Felipe Flores, Physician and Maria Josefa Barrios y Aparicio "Maruca or Cuca" (1878–1959), daughter of Justo Rufino Barrios
 Galvez (Quetzaltenango) – Mariano Gálvez, Guatemalan Independence hero
 Granados, Baja Verapaz – former president Miguel García Granados
 Godinez (Solola) – Juan Godinez, Spanish conquistador
 Horno de Vides (Chiquimula) – Jose Maria Ignacio Ortiz Vides (1941–1983), a Guatemalan guerrilla
 Jerez, Jutiapa – Máximo Jerez, a 19th-century Nicaraguan politician, lawyer and military leader
 Juarez (Quetzaltenango) – Benito Juarez, Mexican President
 Kaibil Balám (Quiche) – Kaybʼil Bʼalam, a 16th-century leader of the Mam people
 La Gomera, Escuintla – Antonio Peraza de Ayala y Rojas, conde de la Gomera
 La Reforma, San Marcos – Justo Rufino Barrios the reformer
 La Union Barrios (Baja Verapaz) – Justo Rufino Barrios
 Livingston, Guatemala – American jurist and politician Edward Livingston
 Los Ochoa (San Marcos) - Bonifacio Ochoa Barrios (1888-1964) and Victor Maria Ochoa Barrios (1872-1951)
 Melchor de Mencos – Sergeant Major, Melchor de Mencos y Barón de Berrieza (1715-1787)
 Modesto Méndez (Izabal) – Modesto Méndez (1801–1863), Guatemalan military
 Morazán, El Progreso – Francisco Morazán, a Central American leader
 Morales, Guatemala – Guatemalan Lawyer and colonel Próspero Morales
 Nuevo San Carlos – King Charles III of Spain
 Palencia, Guatemala – Don Matias de Palencia, Founder
 Puerto Barrios – Justo Rufino Barrios, President of Guatemala
 Quirio Cataño (Chiquimula) - Quirio Cataño, Spanish sculptor
 Recuerdo a Barrios (Quetzaltenango) – Justo Rufino Barrios
 San Carlos Sija – King Charles III of Spain
 San Jacinto, Chiquimula – Hyacinth of Poland, Bishop of Cracovia
 San Joaquin (Alta Verapaz) – Joaquina Cabrera, a former president's mother
 San Jorge (Zacapa) – Jorge Ubico, president
 San Luis Jilotepeque – King Louis IX of France
 San Miguel Dueñas – Don Miguel Dueñas, founder
 Santa Catarina Barahona – Saint Catherine of Alexandria and Sancho de Barahona, Founder
 Santa Cruz Barillas, Santa Elena Barillas (Guatemala) – General Manuel Barillas, president of Guatemala
 Santa Lucía La Reforma – Saint Lucy and Justo Rufino Barrios the liberal reformer
 Santa Rosa Cuilapa – Rose of Lima
 Santo Domingo Suchitepéquez – Dominic of Guzman
 Zaragoza, Chimaltenango – Roman Emperor Caesar Augustus

Guinea Bissau
 São Domingos (Guinea-Bissau) – Saint Dominic of Guzman
 São Vicente, Guinea-Bissau – Vincent of Saragossa

Guyana
 Anna Regina – Anne, Queen of Great Britain
 Buxton, Guyana – Fowell Buxton
 Campbelltown, Guyana – Stephen Campbell, first Amerindian member of Parliament in Guyana
 Fort Wellington, Guyana – Arthur Wellesley, 1st Duke of Wellington
 Georgetown – King George III of the United Kingdom
 Jonestown – Jim Jones, American religious and cult leader
 Lethem – Sir Gordon James Lethem
 Linden, Guyana – Linden Forbes Burnham Sampson, a Prime Minister and President of Guyana
 Matthews Ridge, Guyana – Matthew Young (1905–1996)
 Stabroek, Guyana – Nicholaas Geelvinck, Lord of Stabroek, and President of the Dutch West India Company
 Stewartville, Guyana – John Stewart (1789–1860)
 Victoria, Guyana – Queen Victoria

Haiti
 André, Ouest – André Rigaud
 Bombardopolis – German benefactor, Monsieur de Bombarde
 Dessalines – Jean-Jacques Dessalines, a leader of the Haitian Revolution and the first ruler of independent Haiti
 Dr. Francois Duvalier (Hinche) – François Duvalier
 Cite Simone (Port-au-Prince) – Simone Duvalier, First lady of Haiti
 Ennery, Artibonite – Victor-Therese Charpentier, marquis of Ennerry, Governor General of Saint-Domingue
 Gressier – Edmond Vallery Gressier
 Justin, Ouest – Justin Lhérisson, Haitian writer, lawyer, journalist, and teacher
 Killick Stenio Vincent (Port-au-Prince) – Sténio Vincent, President of Haiti
 Leclerk Bidonville (Port-au-Prince) – Charles Leclerc (general), a French Army general
 Louverture, (Pétion-ville) – Toussaint Louverture
 Morne Boyer (Haiti) – Jean-Pierre Boyer, leader of the Haitian Revolution
 Nan Lavaud (Ouest) - Franck Lavaud
 Ouanaminthe – Juana Mendez (1788–1873), mother of Buenaventura Baez, a Dominican president
 Pétion-Ville – Alexandre Sabès Pétion, President of Haiti
 Simon (Sud) - Tirésias Simon Sam
 Simone (Dessalines) – Simone Duvalier
 Thomas, Ouest – Thomas Madiou
 Village Lumane Casimir (Haiti) – Lumane Casimir (1920–1955), Hatian singer

Former:
 Cite Simone was the name of Cité Soleil – Simone Duvalier
 Duvalierville was the name of Cabaret, Ouest – François Duvalier and Jean-Claude Duvalier

Honduras

 Alfonso XIII (Santa Barbara) – Alfonso XIII of Spain
 Asentamiento Juan Benito Montoya (Copan) – Juan Benito Montoya, peasant leader who was killed in Los Horcones in 1975
 Barrio Paz Barahona (Cortes) – Miguel Paz Barahona
 Cabañas, Copán –José Trinidad Cabañas, President of Honduras
 Cabañas (Danli) – José Trinidad Cabañas
 Cabañas, La Paz – General José Trinidad Cabañas
 Col. Alfonso Guillen (Yoro) – Alfonso Guillen Zelaya (1887–1947), Honduran Poet
 Col. Alfonso Lacayo (Cortes) – Dr. Alfonso Lacayo (1923–1985), Garifuna physician
 Col. Amaya Amador (Yoro) – Ramon Amaya Amador, Honduran author
 Col.  Francisco J. Mejía (Yoro) – Francisco J. Mejía, Honduran teacher
 Col. Francisco Murillo Soto (Yoro) – Prof. Francisco Murillo Soto (1893–1982)
 Col. Jacobo V. Carcamo (Yoro) – Jacobo Carcamo (1916–1959), Honduran Poet
 Col. Jesús Aguilar Paz (Tegucigalpa) – Jesús Aguilar Paz, Honduran Chemist
 Col. Medardo Mejia (Olancho) – Medardo Mejia (1907–1981), Honduran poet
 Col. Rodas Alvarado (Ocotepeque) – Modesto Rodas Alvarado, President of the National Congress
 Col. Terencio Sierra (Cortes) – Terencio Sierra
 Col. Víctor F. Ardón (Tegucigalpa) – Víctor F. Ardón (1896–1976), Honduran educator
 Froylan Turcios (Olancho) – Froylan Turcios, Honduran Poet
 Guadalupe Carney (Colon) – James Carney (American priest), also known as Father Guadalupe Carney
 Grupo Villeda Morales (Atlantida) – Ramon Villeda Morales
 Juan Francisco Bulnes – Juan Francisco Bulnes (1808–1878), Garifuna soldier
 Jesús de Otoro – Fray Juan Félix de Jesús Zepeda y Zepeda (1808–1885), bishop of Comayagua
 José Santos Guardiola –José Santos Guardiola, President of Honduras
 Kennedy (Tegucigalpa) – John F. Kennedy, American President
 Marcovia – Marco Aurelio Soto, President of Honduras
 Marcelino Champagnat (Choluteca) – Saint Marcellin Champagnat
 Melgar Castro (Marcala, La Paz) – Juan Alberto Melgar Castro, former Head of State of Honduras
 Monseñor Fiallos (Tegucigalpa) – Monseñor Ernesto Fiallos (1857–1946),  Honduran priest
 Morazán, Yoro – Francisco Morazán, Honduran liberal politician
 Policarpo Paz Garcia (Yoro) – Policarpo Paz Garcia
 Puerto Cortés – Hernán Cortés, Spanish Conquistador
 Puerto Lempira – cacique Lempira
 Ramón Villeda Morales (municipality) – Dr. Ramón Villeda Morales, President of Honduras
 Rodas Alvarado (Danli) – Modesto Rodas Alvarado, Honduran lawyer
 San Esteban, Olancho – Fray Esteban Verdelete
 San Francisco, Atlántida – Francisco Matute, Benefactor of the town. 
 San Francisco del Valle – Saint Francis and José Cecilio del Valle
 San Jerónimo, Copán – Lic. Jerónimo J.Reina (1876–1918), Honduran poet and journalist
 San Jorge, Ocotepeque – Saint George
 San Luis, Comayagua – King Louis IX of France
 San Pedro Sula – Saint Peter
 Santa Rosa de Aguán – Saint Rose of Lima
 Villeda Morales (Danli) – Ramón Villeda Morales

Hong Kong
 Aberdeen – George Hamilton-Gordon, 4th Earl of Aberdeen
 Belcher Bay – Edward Belcher
  - Sir John Bowring
 Cape D'Aguilar – George Charles D'Aguilar
 Cho Yiu Chuen - Sir Cho Yiu Kwan
 Jat Min Chuen - Tan Jat Min
 Kellet Island - Henry Kellett
 Kennedy Town – Arthur Edward Kennedy
 Lai Tak Tsuen - Michael Wright
 Lee Chung Yin Road
 Morrison Hill - Robert Morrison
 Mount Davis, Hong Kong – John Francis Davis
 St. Paul's Village - St. Paul
 Stanley – Edward Smith-Stanley, 14th Earl of Derby
 Victoria City – Queen Victoria
  - John Wesley

Hungary
 Abasár – King Sámuel Aba of Hungary
 Adyváros – Endre Ady
 Ambrózfalva – Lajos Ambrózy
 Antalhegy – István Antal, Hungarian politician
 Árpádhalom – Árpád, father of the Hungarian fatherland
 Benczúrfalva (Szécsény) – Gyula Benczúr, Painter
 Bocskaikert – Stephen Bocskay, aristocrat
 Cholnokyváros – Jenő Cholnoky (1870–1950)
 Éhen Gyula-lakótelep – Gyula Éhen (1853–1932)
 Erzsébetváros – Queen Elisabeth of Bavaria
 Ferencszállás – Baron Ferenc Gerliczy
 Ferencváros – Francis II, Holy Roman Emperor
 Harkakötöny – Kötöny
 Hunyadfalva – Hunyady family
 Izsófalva – Miklós Izsó, sculptor
 Jánoshalma – John Hunyadi, commander
 Józsefváros – Joseph II, Holy Roman Emperor
 József Attila lakótelep (Budapest) – Attila József
 Katonatelep – Zsigmond Katona (1828–1902)
 Kossuthfalva (Budapest) – Lajos Kossuth, Governor-President of Hungary 
 Krepuska Géza-telep – Géza Krepuska
 Krisztinaváros (Budapest) – Archduchess Maria Christina
 Lipótváros (Budapest) – Leopold II
 Nyírtass – Tas, grandson of Árpád
 Petőfibánya – Sándor Petőfi, poet
 Petőfiszállás – Sándor Petőfi
 Rákóczibánya – Francis II Rákóczi, Hungarian National hero
 Rákóczifalva – Francis II Rákóczi
 Rákócziújfalu – Francis II Rákóczi
 Rudolftelep – Rudolf Cohacht, Hungarian miner
 Sándorfalva – Viscount Sándor Pallavicini
 Solt – Solt
 Taksony – Taksony of Hungary
 Tass – Tas, grandson of Árpád
 Terézváros – Queen Maria Theresa
 Tiborszállás – Tibor Károlyi, Hungarian politician
 Törökbálint – Bálint Török
 Újlipótváros (Budapest) – Leopold II
 Üllő – Üllő, son of Árpád
 Zalaszentgrót – Gerard Sagredo

Former:

 Koháryszentlőrinc was the name of Nyárlőrinc – Koháry family
 Leninváros was the name of Tiszaújváros – Vladimir Lenin
 Prónayfalva was the name of Tázlár – Prónay family
 Sztálinváros was the name of Dunaújváros – Joseph Stalin

Iceland
 Grímsey – Grími Ingjaldsson, who have a winter residence in their island
 Ólafsfjörður – Ólafur Bekkur Karlsson

India

 YSR district - Y. S. Rajasekhara Reddy, Chief Minister of Andhra Pradesh

Indonesia
 Hatta, Bakauheni, Lampung – Mohammad Hatta, 1st Vice President of Indonesia
 Jayawijaya Regency – Jaya-Vijaya, two gatekeepers (Dwarapalaka) of the abode of Vishnu
 Kartini, Sawah Besar, Jakarta – Kartini, Javanese women's rights figure
 Sudirman, Tanralili, Maros, South Sulawesi – Sudirman, Indonesian military officer
Former:
 Sukarnopura was the name of Jayapura – Sukarno, 1st President of Indonesia

Iran
 Ahmadabad-e Mosaddeq – Mohammad Mosaddegh
 Amadegah Shahid Mohammad Montazeri – Mohammad Montazeri
 Apamea (Media) – Apama, mother of Antiochus I Soter
 Apamea Ragiana – a royal woman named Apama among the Seleucids
 Bandar-Abbas – Shah Abbas I
 Bandar-e Emam Khomeyni – Ruhollah Khomeini a Supreme leader, philosopher, revolutionary, and politician
 Hamidaniyeh – Mir Sayyid Ali Hamadani, 14th century Poet and Scholar
 Hasanabad, Tehran – Mostowfi ol-Mamalek, Prime Minister of Iran
 Jammi – 15th century Persian Poet Abdurahman Jami
 Kabak Mohammad Reza – Mohammad Reza Pahlavi, last king
 Kermanshah –  King Bahram IV
 Khomeyni Shahr – Ruhollah Khomeini
 Masjed Soleyman – Solomon, a major prophet of Islam
 Nahavand:
 formerly named Laodicea – Laodice of Macedonia
 formerly named Antiochia – Antiochus I Soter
 Naser Khosrow, Iran – Nasir Khusraw an 11th-century poet
 Piranshahr – Piran, son of Viseh
 Rezaiyeh, Razavi Khorasan – Reza Shah Pahlavi
 Rudaki, Iran – Rudaki, Persian poet
 Seleucia (Susiana) – Seleucus I Nicator
 Seleucia (Susiana) – a Seleucus of the Seleucid dynasty
 Shahrak-e Ayatollah Madani – Mir Asadollah Madani, Iranian politician
 Susa, formerly named Seleucia – Seleucus I Nicator
 Yazd – Yazdegerd I, a Sasanian King of Kings of Iran from 399 to 420
 Yusef Abad –  Mirza Yusef Ashtiani (1813–1887)

Former:
 Bandar-e Pahlavi was the name of Bandar-e Anzali – Reza Shah Pahlavi
 Rezā'īyeh was the name of Urmia – Reza Shah Pahlavi

Iraq
 Al-Aziziyah – Abdülaziz, Ottoman Sultan
 Al-Sadiyah – Sa`d ibn Abi Waqqas, commander who led the Arabs to conquer Mesopotamia from the Sasanian Empire
 Antiochia in Sittacene – Antiochus I Soter
 Apamea (Babylonia) – a royal woman named Apama among the Seleucids
 Apamea (Sittacene) – Apama, mother of Antiochus I Soter
 Charax Spasinu:
 formerly named Alexandria – Alexander the Great
 formerly named Antiochia in Susiana – Antiochus IV
 formerly named Charax of Hyspaosines – Hyspaosines
 Hamza – Bahraini Shia cleric "Ahmad Ibn Hashim Al-Ghurifi" (a.k.a. Hamza)
 Al Hashimiyah – Named after the Hashemites
 Al-Hindiya – "Yahya Asif Al-Dawla Bahadur Al-Hindi", who was a vizier of Bahadur Shah Zafar
 Iskandariya – Alexander the Great
 Kadhimiya – Musa al-Kadhim
 Laodicea (Mesopotamia) – a royal woman named Laodice among the Seleucids
 Al Midhatiya – Midhat Pasha
 Nasiriyah – "Nasir al-Saadun Pasha", the sheikh ("chief") of the Muntafiq tribal confederation
 Al Numaniyah – al-Nu'man III ibn al-Mundhir
 Al-Qasim – "Al-Qasim" son of Musa al-Kadhim
 Sadr City – Mohammad Mohammad Sadeq al-Sadr
 Seleucia – Seleucus I Nicator
 Seleucia (Sittacene) – Seleucus I Nicator
 Sulaymaniyah – Sulaiman Baba, the first Baban prince to gain control of the province of Shahrizor and its capital, Kirkuk
 Yusufiyah – Yūsuf (Joseph)
 Az Zubayr – Zubayr ibn al-Awwam

Ireland (Republic of)
 Bellewstown – Darren Bellew
 Binghamstown – Richard Bingham
 Enniskeane – "island of Cian", Cian Murphy of Cork
 Canningstown – George Canning, 1st Baron Garvagh
 Charlestown – Charles Strickland, Land Agent and Town Planner
 Charleville, Count Cork – Charles II of England
 Connacht – Conn Cétchathach
 County Kerry – Ciar
 Cork – Corc
 Dún Laoghaire – Lóegaire mac Néill
 Edgeworthstown – the Anglo-Irish Edgeworth family, such as Henry Essex Edgeworth de Firmont, local rector, Francis Ysidro Edgeworth, economist, Michael Pakenham Edgeworth, botanist, Richard Lovell Edgeworth, politician, and Maria Edgeworth, writer
 Jamestown, County Leitrim – James VI and I
 Louisburgh, County Mayo – Louis XIV of France
 Rochfortbridge, County Westmeath – Robert Rochfort

Former:
 Maryborough was the name of Portlaoise – Mary I of England
 Philipstown was the name of Daingean – Philip II of Spain
 Kingwilliamstown was the name of Ballydesmond – William IV of the United Kingdom
 Queenstown was the name of Cobh – Queen Victoria

Israel
 Acre, formerly named Antiochia Ptolemais – Alexander the Great's generals Antiochus and Ptolemy Soter
 Balfourya – Arthur James Balfour, British Prime Minister
 Even Shmuel – Samuel Bronfman
 Givat Brenner – Yosef Haim Brenner
 Givat Shapira – Hermann Schapira
 Herzliya – Theodor Herzl, a leader of Zionist movement
 Hippos, formerly named Antiochia Hippos – an Antiochus of the Seleucid dynasty
 Kfar Haim – Haim Arlosoroff
 Kfar Hess – Moses Hess
 Kfar HaRif – Isaac Alfasi
 Kfar Maimon – Yehuda Leib Maimon
 Kfar Masaryk – Tomáš Garrigue Masaryk
 Kfar Menahem – Menachem Ussishkin
 Kfar Netter – Charles Netter
 Kfar Ruppin – Arthur Ruppin
 Kfar Shmuel – Stephen Samuel Wise
 Kfar Silver – Abba Hillel Silver
 Kfar Sirkin – Nachman Syrkin
 Kfar Truman – Harry S. Truman
 Kfar Vitkin – Yosef Vitkin
 Kfar Warburg – Felix M. Warburg
 Kfar Yavetz – Ze'ev Yavetz
 Kiryat Wolfson – Isaac Wolfson
 Kiryat Shmuel, Jerusalem – Shmuel Salant, the Ashkenazi Chief Rabbi of Jerusalem in 1878–1909
 Kokhav Michael – Michael Sobell
 Mishmar David – Mickey Marcus
 Netanya – Nathan Strauss
 Neve Granot – Avraham Granot, a Zionist activist and signatory of the Israeli Declaration of Independence 
 Neve Yaakov – Yitzchak Yaacov Reines
 Qiryat Bialik – writer Hayyim Nahman Bialik
 Ramat Aharon – Rabbi Aharon Kotler
 Ramat Eshkol – Levi Eshkol, Prime Minister of Israel
 Ramat Sharett – Moshe Sharett, Prime Minister of Israel in 1953–1955
 Ramat Shlomo – Shlomo Zalman Auerbach
 Sde David – Zalman David Levontin (1856–1940)
 Sde Eliezer – Robert Rothschild
 Sdei Avraham – Avraham Herzfeld
 Seleucia Samulias – a Seleucus among the Seleucid dynasty
 Talmei Eliyahu – Eliyahu Krauze (1878–1962)
 Talmei Yaffe – Leib Yaffe
 Tiberias – Tiberius Caesar Augustus
 Tzur Yitzhak – Yitzhak Rabin

Former:
 Wilhelma (colloquially; formally: Hamîdije Wilhelma) was the name of Bnei Atarot – Sultan Abdul Hamid II, King William II of Württemberg and William II, German Emperor

Italy

Ivory Coast
 Bingerville – Louis-Gustave Binger, former French colonial governor
 Jean-Baptiste Mockey (Abidjan) - Jean-Baptiste Mockey
 Marie Koré (Abidjan) - Marie Koré (1912-1953), Ivorian independence activist
 Port-Bouët – Édouard Bouët-Willaumez, French admiral
 San-Pédro, Ivory Coast – Saint Peter
 Treichville – Marcel Treich-Laplène, French resident in Ivory Coast
 Yamoussoukro – Queen Yamoussou

Jamaica
 Aberdeen, Jamaica – George Hamilton-Gordon, 4th Earl of Aberdeen
 Albert Town, Jamaica - Albert, Prince Consort
 Alexandria, Jamaica – Alexander Bustamante, First Prime Minister of Jamaica
 Berry Hill (Manchester) - Curtis Philip Berry
 Brown's Town - Hamilton Brown, Scots-Irish planter
 Darlingford, Jamaica - Charles Henry Darling, Governor of Jamaica
 Denham Town - Edward Brandis Denham, Governor of Jamaica
 Gordon Town, Jamaica - George William Gordon
 Granville, Jamaica – Granville Sharp
 Kingston, Jamaica – King William III of England
 Mandeville, Jamaica - George Montagu, 6th Duke of Manchester, viscount Mandeville
 Moore Town, Jamaica - Sir Henry Moore, 1st Baronet
 Nanny Town - Nanny of the Maroons
 Norman Gardens (Kingston) - Norman Manley
 Petersfield, Jamaica – Peter Beckford, Governor of Jamaica
 Queensborough, Kingston - Queen Victoria
 Saint Ann's Bay, Jamaica – Lady Anne Hyde
 Trenchtown - Daniel Power Trench (1813-1884)

Japan
 Asaka, Saitama – Prince Asaka Yasuhiko, a founder of a collateral branch of the Japanese imperial family
 Date, Hokkaidō – Date Kunishige, a Japanese samurai
 Hiroshima – Ōe no Hiromoto + Fukushima Motonaga (disputed)
 Imakane, Hokkaidō – Imamori Tōjirō (1870–1952) + Kanamori Tōjirō (1865–1909)
 Imamura, Saga – Hitoshi Imamura, a Japanese general
 Ina, Saitama – Ina Tadatsugu, a civil officer
 Kita, Hokkaido - Yuji Kitamura (1871-1903)
 Kyōgoku, Hokkaidō – Kyōgoku Takanori (1858–1928), a former noble of the Kyōgoku clan
 Maeda, Aichi – Tadashi Maeda (admiral)
 Masaki, Ehime – Jinzaburō Masaki, Japanese general
 Meiji (Nagoya) - Emperor Meiji
 Narashino, Chiba – Shinohara Kunimoto (1837-1877), a prominent military commander
 Niki, Hokkaidō – Niki Takeyoshi (1834–1915), a Japanese pioneer
 Noda, Chiba – Noda Umanosuke, Japanese military commander during the Muromachi period
 Numata, Hokkaido - Kisaburo Numata (1834-1923)
 Okubo (Yokohama) _ Ōkubo Toshimichi
 Ono, Fukushima – Ono no Takamura, Japanese poet
 Sanjō, Niigata – Sanjo Saemon, a legendary hero during the Edo period
 Saigō, Shimane - Saigō Takamori
 Shōwa, Fukushima - Hirohito (Emperor Shōwa)
 Tadaoka, Osaka – Taira no Tadayuki, son of a Japanese warrior
 Takashimadaira - Takashima Shūhan
 Tendō, Yamagata – Kitabatake Tendōmaru, owner of Tendō castle during the Muromachi period
 Torahime, Shiga – Tora Gozen, a late Heian period prostitute
 Toyota, Aichi - Sakichi Toyoda and Kiichiro Toyoda
 Tsukigata, Hokkaidō – Tsukigata Kiyoshi (1847–1895), Japanese Samurai
 Tsuruga, Fukui – Tsunuga Arashito, Japanese Samurai
 Uchiyama, Aichi – Eitaro Uchiyama, a lieutenant general  
 Wake, Okayama – Wake no Kiyomaro, a high-ranking Japanese official during the Nara period
 Yamamoto, Kagawa – Isoroku Yamamoto, Japanese Marshal Admiral

Jordan
 Abila, formerly named Seleucia – a Seleucus among the Seleucid dynasty
 Al-Abdali –King Abdullah I of Jordan
 Amman – Ammon
 Umm Qais:
 formerly named Antiochia – Antiochus III the Great
 formerly named Seleucia – Seleucus II Callinicus

Kazakhstan

Kenya
 Karen, Kenya – Karen Blixen, a Danish author of the colonial memoir Out of Africa
 Kenyatta, Nairobi – Jomo Kenyatta
 Machakos – Masaku wa Munyati, an Akamba chief who arrived in the area in 1816 from the area around Sultan Hamud
 Port Victoria (Kenya) – Queen Victoria
 Thomson's Falls – Joseph Thomson (explorer)

Kosovo
 Ferizaj – Feriz Shasivari
 Obilić – Miloš Obilić
 Skenderaj – George Kastrioti Skanderbeg

Former:
Đeneral Janković was the name of Elez Han – Božidar Janković

Kuwait
 Abdullah as-Salim suburb – Abdullah Al-Salim Al-Sabah
 Al Ahmadi, Kuwait – Ahmad Al-Jaber Al-Sabah
 Fahd al-Ahmad Suburb – Fahad Al-Ahmed Al-Jaber Al-Sabah
 Jabir al-Ahmad City – Jaber Al-Ahmad Al-Sabah
 Sabah al-Ahmad City – Sabah Al-Ahmad Al-Jaber Al-Sabah
 Sabah as-Salim suburb – Sabah Al-Salim Al-Sabah

Kyrgyzstan
 Аbdrakhmanov (Issyk-Kul) – Yusup Abdrakhmanov (1901–1938), Kyrgyz politician
 Abdy-Suerkulov (Toktogul) – Abdy Suerkulov (1912–1992), Kyrgyz Prime Minister
 Absamat Masaliev (Kadamjay) – Absamat Masaliyev
 Aldashev (Jeti-Ögüz) – Abdulkhai Aldashev (1918–2003), Kyrgyz pharmacologist, toxicologist and translator
 Alla-Anarov (Aravan) – Alla Anarov (1907–1979), cotton producer
 Aydaraliev (Talas) – Rysbek Aidaraliev (1922–1998), Kyrgyz public figure
 Amanbayevo –  Akhmat Amanbayev (1920–1964), Kyrgyz compositor
 Anan'yevo – one of the Panfilov's Twenty-Eight Guardsmen, Nikolay Yakovlevich Anan'yev (1912–1941)
 Baetov –  Kyrgyz singer and composer Musa Baetov (1902–1949)
 Baytik - Baytik Batyr (1823-1886), one of the leaders of the Solto tribe who fought the Kokand Khanate
 Bishkek - Bishkek Batyr (1700-1757), Commander of the Kyrgyz army in the war against the invaders of Dzungar in the 18th century.
 Bokonbayevo – Kyrgyz poet and dramatist, Dzhoomart Bokonbaev (1910–1944)
 Dokturbek Kurmanaliev (Ysyk-Ata) – Dokturbek Kurmanaliev (1948–2004)
 Ibraimov – Kyrgyz Prime Minister Sultan Ibraimov
 Imeni Aliaskara Toktonalieva (Ysyk-Ata) – Aliaskar Toktonaliev (1929–1990), Finance Minister
 Imeni Suymenkula Chokmorova – Kyrgyz film actor Suimenkul Chokmorov
 Imeni Toktomata Zulpueva (Nookat) – Toktomat Zulpuev (1925–1995)
 Isanov (Osh) – Nasirdin Isanov, Kyrgyz Prime Minister
 Jalal-Abad – Jalal-ud-Din Muhammad Akbar
 Jayyl District - Jayyl Batyr (1692-1780), one of the heroes of the Solto tribe
 Karasaev (Tüp) – Kusein Karasaev (1901–1998), Kyrgyz linguist
 Kochubaev (Osh) – Toi'chu Tagaevich Kochubaev (1922–1981), Kyrgyz Socialist workers' hero
 Kulatov (Nookat) – Turabay Kulatov (1908–1984), Kyrgyz Prime Minister
 Kurmanbek (Suzak) – Kurmanbek Batyr, mythical hero
 Lenin District, Bishkek – Vladimir Lenin
 Manas District – Manas, mythical Kyrgyz national hero
 Mavlyanov (Aksy) – Junai Mavlyanov (1923–2003), writer and poet
 Mombekovo (Nooken) – Yusup Mombekov (1926–1983), Kyrgyz socialist workers' hero
 Nazaraliev (Aksy) – Orozaaly Nazaraliev (1898–1957), Kyrgyz educator
 Nurzhanov (Talas) – Akmatbek Nurzhanov (1922–1987), Kyrgyz socialist workers' hero
 Urazbekov (Batken) – Abdukadyr Urazbekov (1889–1938), Kyrgyz statesman
 Osmonkulov (Talas) – Iskender Osmonkulov (1907–1992), Kyrgyz socialist workers' hero
 Panfilov District, Kyrgyzstan – Ivan Panfilov
 Pristan'-Przheval'sk - Nikolay Przhevalsky
 Semyonovka, Issyk Kul - Pyotr Semyonov-Tyan-Shansky
 Sverdlov District, Bishkek – Yakov Sverdlov
 Shopokov – Kyrgyz World War II hero Duyshenkul Shopokov (1915–1941)
 Toktogul – Kyrgyz Musician Toktogul Satilganov
 Zharkynbayevo – Kyrgyz hero Kazak Zharkynbaev (1911–1969)

Former:
 Frunze was the name of Bishkek from 1926 through 1991 – Mikhail Frunze
 Przhevalsk was the name of Karakol from 1888 through 1921 and 1939 through 1991 – Nikolai Przhevalsky

Laos
 Kaysone Phomvihane District, Savannakhet Province – Kaysone Phomvihane, President of Laos

Latvia
 Jēkabpils – Jacob Kettler, Duke of the Duchy of Courland and Semigallia
 Lucavsala –  Klauss Lucavs
 Pāvilosta – after Paul von Lilienfeld, governor of Kurzeme
 Pētersala-Andrejsala – Peter the Great
 Valdemārpils – Krišjānis Valdemārs, writer and politician
 Valka (Estonian: Valga) – possibly after the de Walko (de Walco) family

Former:
 Stučka was the name of Aizkraukle – Pēteris Stučka, Latvian revolutionary and communist

Lebanon
  Foch-Allenby district (Beirut) – Ferdinand Foch and Edmund Allenby, 1st Viscount Allenby

Former:
 Laodicea in Phoenicia was an ancient name of Beirut – royal woman named Laodice among the Seleucid dynasty

Lesotho
 Mohale's Hoek – Mohale, a King Moshoeshoe I's brother

Liberia

 A.B. Tolbert Community – Adolphus Benedict Tolbert (died in 1980), a former President's son
 Arthington, Liberia – Robert Arthington, an attorney and philanthropist from Leeds, England 
 Barclayville – Edwin Barclay, President of Liberia
 Buchanan – Thomas Buchanan
 Careysburg – Lott Carey, a Baptist minister
 Clay-Ashland – Henry Clay, an American lawyer, planter, and statesman
 Greenville, Liberia – Judge James Green
 Harper, Liberia – Robert Goodloe Harper, American politician
 Monrovia – James Monroe, President of the United States
 Robertsport – Joseph Jenkins Roberts, First President of Liberia
 Samuel K. Doe Community (Monrovia) - Samuel Doe
 Tubmanburg – William Tubman, President of Liberia

Libya
 ʽAziziya – Abdulaziz, Sultan of the Ottoman Empire 
 Benghazi – Sidi Ghazi, Benefactor of the city
 Ptolemais – a king of the Ptolemies, probably Ptolemy III Euergetes
 Qaryat ‘Umar al Mukhtar – Omar Mukhtar, Libyan resistance leader

Lithuania
 Grigiškės – Hryhoriy Kurec, Belarusian architect
 Janapolė – Jan Długosz
 Jonava – Jono Eustachijaus
 Kaišiadorys – a Tatar noble, Khaishadar
 Kudirkos Naumiestis – Vincas Kudirka, Lithuanian poet
 Marijampolė – Blessed Virgin Mary

Former:

 Sniečkus was the name of Visaginas – Antanas Sniečkus, Lithuanian communist politician

Luxembourg
 Ettelbruck – Etzel (Attila the Hun)

Macedonia
 Čučer-Sandevo – Aleksandar Urdarevski-Sande (1920–1943), participant in the National Liberation War
 Dame Gruev (Skopje) – Dame Gruev
 Delčevo – Goce Delčev, revolutionary hero
 Gazi Baba Municipality – Ottoman poet Aşık Çelebi
 Gjorče Petrov Municipality – revolutionary Gjorče Petrov
 Jane Sandanski (Skopje) – Yane Sandanski
 Josifovo – Josif Josifovski (1915–1943)
 Sveti Nikole – Saint Nicholas
 Titov Vrv – Josip Broz, President of Yugoslavia
Former:
 Titov Veles (meaning: "Tito's Veles") was the name of Veles – Josip Broz

Malaysia
 Beaufort, Malaysia – Leicester Paul Beaufort, colonial governor of North Borneo
 Bandar Dato' Onn – Onn Jaafar, Malayan politician
 Bandar Menjalara – Paduka Seri Cik Menjalara (d.1941) 
 Bandar Muadzam Shah – Abu Bakar of Pahang
 Bandar Seri Putra – Tunku Abdul Rahman
 Bandar Tun Abdul Razak – Abdul Razak Hussein, 2nd Prime Minister of Malaysia
 Bandar Tun Hussein Onn – Hussein Onn, 3rd Prime Minister of Malaysia
 Bandar Tun Razak – Abdul Razak Hussein
 Bandar Tun Razak, Jengka – Abdul Razak Hussein
 Butterworth, Penang – William John Butterworth, governor of the Straits Settlements 
 Cameron Highlands – William Cameron, British geologist
 Carey Island – Edward Valentine John Carey, English planter in Malaya
 FELDA L.B. Johnson – Lyndon B. Johnson, American president
 FELDA Soeharto – Soeharto, Indonesian president
 Fraser's Hill – Louis James Fraser, Scottish pioneer
 George Town, Penang – George III of the United Kingdom
 Gohtong Jaya – Lim Goh Tong, Malaysian Chinese businessman & entrepreneur
 Hang Tuah Jaya – Hang Tuah, legendary hero
 Kampung Gandhi – Mahatma Gandhi
 Pekan Gurney – Henry Gurney, British colonial administrator
 Port Dickson – John Frederick Dickson, British colonial administrator
 Putrajaya – Tunku Abdul Rahman, father of Malayan independence
 Seri Iskandar – Iskandar of Perak, 30th Sultan of Perak
 Shah Alam – Hisamuddin of Selangor
 Taman Tun Dr Ismail – Ismail Abdul Rahman
 Taman Tun Sardon – Sardon Jubir, governor of Penang
 Taman Tun Teja – Princess Tun Teja
 Taman U-Thant – U Thant, UN General Secretary from 1961 until 1971,
 Templer's Park – Gerald Templer, senior British Army officer 
 Victoria, Labuan – Queen Victoria
 Weston – A.J. West, British North Borneo railway engineer

Malawi
 Aaron, Malawi – biblical prophet Aaron
 Banda (Central) – Hastings Banda
 Cape Maclear – Thomas Maclear
 Fort Maguire (Southern) – Captain Cecil Montgomery Maguire (died on 1891)
 Livingstonia, Malawi – David Livingstone
 Liwonde – Chief Liwonde (died on 1921)

Former:
Fort Anderson was the name of Mulanje - Sir Henry Percy Anderson (1831-1896), Harry Johnston´s father-in-law
Fort Hill was the name of Chitipa - Clement Lloyd Hill, British diplomat
Fort Johnston was the name of Mangochi - Harry Johnston, British botanist and colonial administrator
Fort Lister was the name of Phalombe - Thomas Villiers Lister, British diplomat
Fort Manning was the name of Mchinji - William Manning (colonial administrator), Governor of Nyasaland

Mali
 Ouezzindougou – Daniel Ouezzin Coulibaly, Burkinabé politician
 Timbuktu – Buktu, a malian old woman who lived in that region

Malta
 Cottonera – Grandmaster Nicolas Cotoner
 Floriana – architect Pietro Paolo Floriani
 Manoel Island – Grandmaster António Manoel de Vilhena
 Paola – Grandmaster Antoine de Paule
 Paceville – Dr. Giuseppe Pace (1890–1971)
 Qormi (Città Pinto) – Grandmaster Manuel Pinto da Fonseca
 San Ġiljan – St. Julian
 San Ġwann – St. John
 San Lawrenz – St. Lawrence
 San Pawl il-Baħar – Paul the Apostle
 Santa Luċija – St. Lucy
 Santa Venera – St. Venera
 Senglea – Grandmaster Claude de la Sengle
 Siġġiewi (Città Ferdinand) – Grandmaster Ferdinand von Hompesch
 Valletta – Grandmaster Jean Parisot de Valette
 Victoria – Queen Victoria
 Żabbar (Città Hompesch) – Grandmaster Ferdinand von Hompesch
 Żebbuġ (Città Rohan) – Grandmaster Emmanuel de Rohan-Polduc
 Żejtun (Città Beland) – Ferdinand von Hompesch's mother

Mauritania
 Boubacar Ben Amer – Abu Bakr Ibn Omar (d.1087)

Mauritius
 Mahébourg – Bertrand-François Mahé de La Bourdonnais
 Port Louis – Louis XV of France
 Souillac – François de Souillac

Mexico

 Apodaca, Nuevo León – Dr. Salvador de Apodaca y Loreto, bishop 
 Ciudad Juárez – Benito Juárez, president
 Ciudad López Mateos – Adolfo López Mateos, president
 Ciudad Nezahualcoyotl – Nezahualcoyotl, poet
 Ciudad Obregón – Álvaro Obregón, president 
 Ciudad Victoria – Guadalupe Victoria, first president
 General Escobedo – Mariano Escobedo
 Hermosillo – José María González Hermosillo
 Guadalupe, Zacatecas and other communities named Guadalupe – Our Lady of Guadalupe (Mary)
 Guerrero state and several other localities – Vicente Guerrero, independence leader and president
 Hidalgo, state and several other localities – Miguel Hidalgo y Costilla, independence leader and Father of the Nation
 Lázaro Cárdenas, Michoacán – Lázaro Cárdenas del Río, president
 Morelia – José María Morelos, independence leader 
 Morelos state and several other localities – José María Morelos, independence leader 
 San Luis Potosí City and state – King Louis IX of France
 San Nicolas de los Garza – Pedro de la Garza, benefactor of the town
 Tuxtla Gutiérrez – Joaquín Miguel Gutiérrez, independence leader 
 Quintana Roo – Andrés Quintana Roo, politician

Moldova
 Alexandru Ioan Cuza, Cahul – Alexandru Ioan Cuza, Prince of Moldavia
 Cantemir, Moldova – Dimitrie Cantemir
 Ciorescu, Chisinau – Ion Gheorghe Ciorescu (founder)
 Frunză, Ocnița – Mikhail Frunze
 Ion Vodă, Florești – John III the Terrible
 Lazo, Ștefan Vodă – Sergey Lazo, Moldavian revolutionary
 Lebedenco, Cahul – Nikita Lebedenko, Soviet military leader
 Miciurin – Ivan Vladimirovich Michurin
 Regina Maria, Soroca – Marie of Romania
 Ștefan Vodă – Stephen III of Moldavia

Former:
 "Kotovsk" was the name of Hîncești – Grigory Kotovsky
 "Kutuzov" was the name of Ialoveni – Mikhail Kutuzov
 "Lazovsk" was the name of Sîngerei – Sergey Lazo
 "Suvorovo" was the name of Ștefan Vodă – Alexander Suvorov

Mongolia
 Choibalsan city, Dornod – Khorloogiin Choibalsan
 Choibalsan sum, Dornod – Khorloogiin Choibalsan
 Khatanbulag - Börte, Great Khatun of the Mongol Empire
 Magsarjav (Khovd) – Khatanbaatar Magsarjav
 Öndörkhaan (now Chinggis Khot) – Genghis Khan
 Renchinlkhümbe – Jambyn Lkhümbe
 Sükhbaatar city – Damdin Sükhbaatar, Mongolian independence hero
 Sükhbaatar district – Damdin Sükhbaatar
 Sükhbaatar Province – Damdin Sükhbaatar
 Ulaanbaatar – Damdin Sükhbaatar

Montenegro
 Danilovgrad – Danilo I, Prince of Montenegro
 Herceg Novi – Duke (Herceg) Stjepan Vukčić Kosača
 Petrovac – King Peter I of Serbia
 Tomaševo – Tomaš Žižić, Montenegrin national hero

Former:
 Titograd was the name of Podgorica from 1946 to 1992 – Josip Broz Tito
 Ivangrad was the name of Berane from 1946 to 1992 – Ivan Milutinovic

Morocco
 Mohammedia – King Mohammed V of Morocco
 Moulay Rachid (district) – Prince Moulay Rachid of Morocco

Mozambique
 Beira, Mozambique - Luís Filipe, Prince Royal of Portugal (titled Prince of Beira)
 Maputo - Chief Maputsu I of the Tembe clan
 Mozambique Island – Mussa Bin Bique, a Arab Muslim chief of the early 16th century
 Ilha Josina Machel (Manhiça) – Josina Machel, a former President's wife
 Manhiça District – Manacusse, a Tchaka chief, who moved here after some conflict in his native area
 Ressano Garcia – Frederico Ressano Garcia (1847-1911), Portuguese politician and engineer
 Vila Eduardo Mondlane – Eduardo Mondlane, President of the Mozambican Liberation Front (FRELIMO)

Former:
 António Enes was the name of Angoche - António José Enes (1848-1901), Portuguese journalist and colonial administrator
 Augusto Cardoso was the name of Metangula - Augusto Cardoso (1859-1930), Portuguese explorer
 Caldas Xavier  was the name of Cambulatsitse - Alfredo Augusto Caldas Xavier (1852-1896), Portuguese colonial administrator
 Cidade Salazar was the name of Matola - António de Oliveira Salazar
 João Belo was the name of Xai-Xai - João Belo (1878-1928), Portuguese military
 Lourenço Marques was the name of Maputo - Lourenço Marques (explorer)
 Malvernia was the name of Chicualacuala (Vila Eduardo Mondlane) - Godfrey Huggins, 1st Viscount Malvern
 Porto Amélia was the name of Pemba, Mozambique - Queen Amélie of Orléans
 Vila Coutinho was the name of Ulongué - João António de Azevedo Coutinho Fragoso de Sequeira (1865-1944)
 Vila Fontes was the name of Caia, Mozambique - Fontes Pereira de Melo
 Vila Gomes da Costa was the name of Alto Changane - Manuel Gomes da Costa, Portuguese president
 Vila Gouveia was the name of Catandica - Manuel António de Sousa, Portuguese military captain
 Vila Junqueiro was the name of Gurúè - Manuel Saraiva Junqueiro (d.1959)
 Vila Machado was the name of Nhamatanda - Joaquim José Machado
 Vila Paiva de Andrada was the name of Gorongosa - Joaquim Carlos Paiva de Andrada (1846-1928)
 Vila Pery was the name of Chimoio - João Pery de Lind (1861-1930), Governor of Mozambique Company Territories of Manica and Sofala
 Vila Pinto Teixeira was the name of Mabalane - Francisco dos Santos Pinto Teixeira (1887-1983), Portuguese military engineer
 Vila Trigo de Morais was the name of Chokwe, Mozambique - António Trigo de Morais (1895-1966), Portuguese engineer
 Vila Vasco da Gama was the name of Chiputo - Vasco da Gama

Myanmar
 Maha Bandula Park – General Maha Bandula
 Mindon, Myanmar – Mindon Min, King of Burma
 Thibaw, Shan State – Thibaw Min, King of Burma

Namibia
 Caprivi Strip – Leo von Caprivi, German general and statesman
 Henties Bay, Namibia – Major Hentie van der Merwe (1871-1954)
 John Pandeni Constituency – John Pandeni, a member of the South West Africa People's Organization (SWAPO)
 Judea Lyaboloma Constituency –  Judea Lyaboloma (died in 1968), a former People's Liberation Army of Namibia (PLAN) guerrilla
 Keetmanshoop – Johann Keetman, German trader
 Lüderitz – Adolf Lüderitz
 Mariental, Namibia – Maria, the wife of the first colonial settler of the area, Hermann Brandt
 Moses ǁGaroëb Constituency – Moses ǁGaroëb, a Namibian Politician
 Nehale lyaMpingana Constituency – Nehale Mpingana, Namibian National hero
 Samora Machel Constituency – Samora Machel, President of Mozambique
 Tobias Hainyeko constituency – Tobias Hainyeko, a guerrilla war hero

Former:
 Caprivi Region was the name of Zambezi Region, named after Leo von Caprivi
 Schuckmannsburg – Bruno von Schuckmann (since 2013 called Luhonono)

Nepal
 Bhimdatta – Bhimdatta Panta, a revolutionary farmer leader
 Birendranagar – King Birendra of Nepal
 Birendranagar, Chitwan – King Birendra of Nepal
 Birgunj – Bir Shumsher Jung Bahadur Rana, Nepali statesman
 Byans – Vyas, legendary author of Hinduism
 Dasharathchand – Dashrath Chand, a martyr of Nepalese Democratic Movement
 Janakpur – King Janak, an ancient Indian king of Videha,
 Jaya Prithvi – Jaya Prithvi Bahadur Singh, a humanist, peace advocate, writer and social activist
 K.I. Singh Rural Municipality – Kunwar Inderjit Singh, 20th Prime Minister of Nepal
 Krishnapur, Nepal – Krishna
 Mahendrakot, Mahendranagar, Dhanusha, Mahendranagar, Sunsari – Mahendra of Nepal
 Ramprasad Rai – Ram Prasad Rai, a Nepali revolutionary who was disappeared and killed in 1951
 Siddharthanagar – from Buddha's given name Siddhartha
 Tribhuwannagar – Tribhuvan of Nepal
 Vyas – Sage Vyasadeva (Vyas)

Netherlands
 Anna Paulowna – Anna Pavlovna of Russia
 Emmaberg – Queen Emma of Waldeck and Pyrmont
 Geertruidenberg – Gertrude of Nivelles
 's-Gravenzande (lit. The Count's Sand) – William, King of the Romans (and Count of Holland)
 Heerhugowaard – lord ('heer') Hugo of Assendelft
 's-Hertogenbosch (lit. The Duke's Forest) – Henry I, Duke of Brabant
 Julianadorp – Queen Juliana of the Netherlands
 Koningsbosch (lit. King's Forest) – Charles V, Holy Roman Emperor
 Koningsoord (Het Hogeland) - William III of the Netherlands
 Mariaparochie - Mary, mother of Jesus
 Lelystad – ir. Cornelis Lely
 Odiliapeel - Odilia of Cologne
 Oud-Beijerland, Nieuw-Beijerland and Zuid-Beijerland - Sabina, Duchess of Bavaria (Dutch: Sabina van Beieren)
 Philippine, Netherlands - Philip I of Castile
 Prins Alexander – Alexander, Prince of Orange
 Sint Annaparochie – Saint Anne
 Sint Jacobiparochie – James, son of Zebedee
 Sint Maarten – Martin of Tours
 Sint Nicolaasga – Saint Nicholas
 Sint-Oedenrode – Saint Oda
 Sint Pancras – Saint Pancras
 Sint Willebrord – Saint Willibrord
 Van Ewijcksluis – Daniël Jacob van Ewijck van Oostbroek van de Built (1786-1858), Dutch Politician
 Wilhelminadorp, Best – Queen Wilhelmina of the Netherlands
 Wilhelminadorp, Goes – Wilhelmine of Prussia, Queen of the Netherlands
 Wilhelminaoord – Queen Wilhelmina of the Netherlands
 Willemsdorp – King William I of the Netherlands
 Willemsoord, Steenwijkerland – King William II of the Netherlands
 Willemstad, North Brabant – William the Silent, Father of the Dutch fatherland

New Zealand
 Addisons Flat, West Coast – unknown African American gold prospector
 Aidanfield – Mother Aidan Phelan (1858–1958)
 Albert Town – Prince Albert
 Alexandra – Alexandra of Denmark
 Allanton – James Allan
 Alfredton – Alfred, Duke of Saxe-Coburg and Gotha
 Andersons Bay – James Anderson and family
 Arthurs Point – Thomas Arthur
 Ashburton –  Francis Baring, Baron Ashburton 
 Auckland – George Eden, Earl of Auckland
 Ballance – John Ballance
 Bell Block – Dillon Bell
 Benneydale – Matt Benney and Tom Dale
 Blaketown – Isaac Blake
 Brockville – Frederick Brock-Hollinshead 
 Bronte –  Admiral Lord Nelson, Duke of Bronté 
 Brunner – Thomas Brunner
 Brydone – Thomas Brydone
 Carterton – Charles Carter
 Charleston – Captain Charles Bonner 
 Christchurch – Jesus Christ (indirectly via Christ Church, a college of the University of Oxford in England)
 Clarkville – Joseph Clark
 Clive – Robert Clive ("Clive of India")
 Clinton – Henry Pelham-Clinton, 5th Duke of Newcastle
 Clyde – Lord Clyde
 Coatesville – Gordon Coates, Prime Minister
 Cobden – Richard Cobden
 Collingwood – Admiral Cuthbert Collingwood
 Colville – Alexander Colville, 7th Lord Colville of Culross 
 Cromwell – possibly Oliver Cromwell
 Dargaville – Joseph Dargaville
 Days Bay – George Day
 Dennison – R.B. Denniston 
 Dobson – George Dobson
 Duders Beach – Thomas Duder
 Evansdale – William Evans
 Eyreton – Edward John Eyre
 Featherston – Isaac Featherston
 Feilding – William Feilding
 Fendalton – Walpole Chesshyre Fendall (1830–1913)
 Fordlands – Harry Ford
 Foxton – William Fox, Premier
 Franz Josef / Waiau – Franz Joseph I of Austria
 Frasertown – Major James Fraser
 Gabriel's Gully – Gabriel Read 
 Gisborne – William Gisborne
 Gladstone – William Ewart Gladstone
 Godley Head – John Robert Godley
 Gore – Thomas Gore Browne
 Greerton – Lieutenant-Colonel Henry Harpur Greer
 Grey River / Māwheranui, Greymouth, Greytown – George Grey, Governor
 Haast – Julius von Haast
 Halswell – Edmund Storr Halswell QC (1790–1874)
 Hamilton – John Fane Charles Hamilton 
 Hampden – John Hampden
 Hanmer Springs – Thomas Hanmer
 Harrisville – Benjamin Harris
 Hastings – Warren Hastings
 Havelock – Henry Havelock 
 Havelock North – Henry Havelock 
 Helensville – Helen McLeod, wife of John McLeod
 Hinds – Samuel Hinds
 Hope – Jane Hope
 Hunterville – George Hunter
 Hyde – John Hyde Harris
 Invercargill – William Cargill
 Jack's Point – "Maori Jack" Tewa
 Jacksons – Michael Jackson
 Kennedys Bush – Thomas Kennedy
 Kimbell - Frederick J. Kimbell
 Levin – William Hort Levin
 Lincoln – Earl of Lincoln
 Linton – James Linton
 Lower Hutt – Sir William Hutt
 Lyell – Charles Lyell 
 Lyttelton – the Lyttelton family 
 Macraes – John MacRae
 Mackenzie Basin – James Mckenzie
 Mackenzie District – James Mckenzie
 Macetown – brothers Charles, Harry, and John Mace
 Mairtown – Gilbert Mair and family
 Martinborough – John Martin
 Massey – William Massey, Prime Minister
 Masterton – Joseph Masters
 Mauriceville – Maurice O'Rourke
 Maxwell (now Pākaraka) – Sergeant George Maxwell
 McLaren Park, New Zealand – Bruce McLaren
 Melville – James Dougal Melville (1841–1909)
 Mercer –  Captain Henry Mercer
 Moncks Bay – John Stanley Monck 
 Millers Flat – Walter Miller
 Murchison – Roderick Murchison
 Napier – Charles James Napier
 Nelson – Admiral Horatio Nelson
 Ormondville – John Davies Ormond
 Palmerston – Henry Temple, 3rd Viscount Palmerston
 Palmerston North – Henry Temple, 3rd Viscount Palmerston
 Picton – Thomas Picton
 Plimmerton – John Plimmer
 Port Albert – Prince Albert
 Port Chalmers – Thomas Chalmers
 Port Levy –  Solomon Levey
 Port Underwood – Joseph Underwood 
 Prestons – Thomas Herbert Preston
 Pyes Pa – Charles Pye, VC
 Queenstown – Queen Victoria
 Raglan – Lord Raglan
 Rātana Pā – T. W. Ratana
 Renwick – Thomas Renwick
 Ross – George Ross
 Saint Arnaud – Jacques Leroy de Saint-Arnaud
 Seddon – Richard Seddon, Prime Minister
 Seddonville – Richard Seddon, Prime Minister
 Sumner – John Bird Sumner
 Tasman – Abel Tasman
 Upper Hutt – Sir William Hutt
 Victoria – Queen Victoria
 Vogeltown – Julius Vogel, Premier
 Wakefield – Arthur Wakefield
 Waldronville – Bill Waldron (1909–1976)
 Ward – Joseph Ward
 Wellington – Duke of Wellington
 Wellsford – an acronym derived from the surnames of the first European families who settled in the region 
 West Eyreton – Edward John Eyre
 Whitford – Richard Whitford
 Winton – Thomas Winton
 Wyndham – Charles Ash Windham

Nicaragua
 Ahmed Campos Correa (Chontales) – Ahmed Campos Correa (1956–1982), a Nicaraguan Poet
 Arlen Siu (Granada) – Arlen Siu, a guerrilla revolutionary heroine
 Bernardino Diaz Ochoa (Granada) – Bernadino Diaz Ochoa (1941–1971), a Nicaraguan peasant and revolutionary
 Bluefields – Abraham Blauvelt, a Dutch privateer, pirate and explorer of Central America in the 1630s
 Carazo Department – Evaristo Carazo, President of Nicaragua
 Cárdenas – Adán Cárdenas, President of Nicaragua
 Ciudad Darío – Rubén Dario, Nicaraguan poet
 Ciudad Sandino – Revolutionary Augusto César Sandino
 El Viejo – Cacique Agateyte
 Filiberto Morales (Chinandega) – Filiberto Morales Darce (d.1979)
 German Pomares (Jinotega), German Pomares (Nueva Segovia) – German Pomares Ordonez (1936–1979), a Nicaraguan national hero
 Greytown, Nicaragua – Charles Edward Grey, a British judge and colonial governor
 Gaspar García (Rivas) – Gaspar García Laviana
 Hilario Sanchez (Managua) – Hilario Sánchez Vásquez (1953–1983), a Nicaraguan military
 Jesus Rivera (Jinotega) – Manuel de Jesus Rivera "La Mascota" (1965–1978), a Nicaraguan revolutionary kid
 Jose Benito Escobar (Matagalpa) and Jose Benito Escobar (South Caribbean Coast Autonomous Region) – Jose Benito Escobar (1936–1978), revolutionary
 La Concepción, Masaya – Immaculate Conception of Mary
 Larreynaga – Miguel Larreynaga, Nicaraguan philosopher
 Leon Diaz (Jinotega) – General Jose Leon Diaz, Salvadoran military of one of 30 militaries during the Nicaraguan Revolution
 Leonel Rugama (Esteli) – Jose Leonel Rugama (1949–1970), Nicaraguan poet
 Macario Brenes (Masaya) – Macario Brenes Alvarez (died in 1979)
 Madriz Department – Jose Madriz, President of Nicaragua
 Marlon Zelaya (Rio San Juan) – Marlon Zelaya Cruz (1962–1983), a student martyr
 Monseñor Madrigal (Nueva Segovia) – Monseñor Nicolás Antonio Madrigal y García (1898–1977)
 Pablo Ubeda (Boaco) – Rigoberto Cruz (died in 1967), also known as Pablo Ubeda, one of the founders of the FSLN
 Padre Ramos (Chinandega) – Father Francisco Ramos, Nicaraguan priest
 Puerto Benjamin Zeledon – Benjamin Zeledon, national hero of Nicaragua
 Puerto Cabezas – Rigoberto Cabezas, journalist, military figure and politician
 Puerto Diaz, Chontales – Adolfo Díaz, President of Nicaragua
 Puerto Morazán – Francisco Morazán, a Honduran Politician
 Puerto Salvador Allende (Managua) – Salvador Allende
 Ricardo Morales Avilés (Granada) – Ricardo Morales Avilés (1939–1973)
 Rigoberto Lopez Perez (Managua) – Rigoberto Lopez Perez, Nicaraguan poet
 Rivas Department – Patricio Rivas, President of Nicaragua
 Rivas, Nicaragua – Francisco Rodriguez de Rivas (1674–1743), Captain General of Guatemala
 Roman Esteban Toledo (Carazo) – Roman del Carmen Esteban Toledo (1950–1979), revolutionary
 Ruben Dario (South Caribbean Coast Autonomous Region) – Ruben Dario
 San Dionisio, Matagalpa – Dionisio de Herrera, president of Nicaragua
 San Fernando, Nueva Segovia – King Ferdinand III of Spain
 San Francisco Chontales (Villa Sandino) - Rev. Frank Setzer (1911-2000)
 San Francisco del Norte – Saint Francis
 San Jose de Cusmapa – José Dolores Estrada
 San José de los Remates – José María Guerrero de Arcos y Molina, director of the State of Nicaragua
 San Lorenzo de los Tellez – Saint Lawrence and Josefa Tellez, owner of a small farm in the vicinity of the area
 Santa Lucía, Boaco – Saint Lucy
 Santa María, Nueva Segovia – Saint Mary
 San Nicolás, Estelí – Saint Nicholas
 San Pedro del Norte – Saint Peter
 San Ramón, Matagalpa – Saint Raymond Nonnatus
 Santa Teresa, Carazo – Saint Teresa of Ávila
 Santo Tomás del Norte – Tomas Ruiz Romero (1777–1819), Priest and independence hero
 Socrates Sandino (Masaya) – Socrates Sandino Tiffer (1875–1935), a Sandino's paternal brother
 Villa Carlos Fonseca – Carlos Fonseca Amador, founder of the Sandinista National Liberation Front
 Villa Sandino – revolutionary Augusto César Sandino

Niger
 Cité Fayçal (Niamey) – Faisal of Saudi Arabia

Nigeria
 Port Harcourt – Lewis Vernon Harcourt, 1st Viscount Harcourt
 Victoria Island, Lagos – Queen Victoria

North Korea
 Kimchaek – Korean People's Army (KPA) general, Kim Chaek
 Kimhyonggwon County – Korean revolutionary Kim Hyong-gwon
 Kimhyongjik County – Korean independence activist Kim Hyong-jik
 Kimjongsuk County – Korean anti-Japanese guerrilla and Kim Il-sung's first wife Kim Jong-suk

Norway
 Edgeøya – Thomas Edge
 Eydehavn – Sam Eyde, an industrial pioneer
 Filipstad, Norway – pharmacist Philip Moth
 Fredrikstad – King Frederick II of Denmark and Norway
 Jan Mayen – Captain Jan Jacobszoon May van Schellinkhout
 Kongsberg – King Christian IV of Denmark and Norway
 Kongsvinger – King Christian V of Denmark and Norway
 Kristiansand – King Christian IV of Denmark and Norway
 Kristiansund – King Christian VI of Denmark and Norway
 Longyearbyen – world's northernmost town – John Munroe Longyear

Former:
 Christiania (from 1624 through 1877) and then Kristiania (from 1877 through 1925) were the names of Oslo – King Christian IV of Denmark and Norway
 Fredrikshald was the name of Halden from 1665 through 1928 – King Frederick III of Denmark and Norway
 Fredriksvern was the name of Stavern from 1799 through 1930 – King Frederick V of Denmark and Norway
 Victoriahavn was the name of Narvik from 1887 through 1902 – Crown princess of Norway, Victoria of Baden

Oman
 Madinat Al Sultan Qaboos – Sultan Qaboos

Pakistan
 Abbottabad – James Abbott
 Aliabad, Hunza - Ali, cousin of the prophet Muhammad
 Aziz Bhatti Town – Raja Aziz Bhatti, Pakistani military officer
 Bahawalnagar – Bahawal Khan V
 Bahawalpur –  Nawab Mohammad Bahawal Khan Abbasi (1715–1749)
 Chowk Sarwar Shaheed Tehsil - Raja Muhammad Sarwar, Pakistani army officer
 Dera Allah Yar – Political Leader Mir Allahyar Khan Khosa (d.1984)
 Dera Ismail Khan – Ismail Khan
 Dera Murad Jamali – Mir Muhammad Murad Jamali, an assassinated Pakistani leader
 Faisalabad – King Faisal of Saudi Arabia
 Fatehpur Thakiala – Sardar Fateh Muhammad Khan Karelvi (d.1988)
 Fort Abbas - Abbas Abbasi, Amir of the Bahawalpur State and former governor of Punjab
 Haripur, Pakistan - Hari Singh Nalwa
 Haroonabad, Bahawalnagar - Sahibzada Muhammad Haroon-ur-Rashid Ahmad Abbasi (1924-1972), son of Nawab of Bahawalpur sir Sadeq Mohammad Khan V
 Hayatabad – Hayat Sherpao
 Iqbal Town, Lahore – Muhammad Iqbal, Pakistani national poet
 Jacobabad – John Jacob
 Jafarabad District – Jafar Khan Jamali, a Muslim League veteran from Balochistan 
 Jamshed Town – Jamshed Nusserwanjee Mehta, first elected Mayor of Karachi 
 Jauharabad – Mohammad Ali Jauhar, one of several prominent leaders of the Pakistan Movement
 Jinnahabad (Abbottabad) – Muhammad Ali Jinnah, Father of the nation
 Khairpur Nathan Shah – Sufi Saint Hazrat Nathan Shah (d.1983)
 Kot Ghulam Muhammad – Ghulam Muhammad Khan Bhurgri, one of the pioneers of the Pakistan Movement
 Liaquatabad Town and Liaquatpur – Liaquat Ali Khan, Pakistani statesman
 Minchinabad - Colonel Charles Minchin (1829-1898), British political Agent
 Miranshah - Miran Shah 
 Muzaffarabad – Sultan Raja Muzaffar Khan
 Muzaffargarh – Nawab Muzaffar Khan (d.1818), Afghan Popalzai governor of Multan
 Nankana Sahib – Guru Nanak
 Nasirabad District - Muhammad Nasir Khan I (1710-1794), ruler of Kalat
 Nazimabad – Khawaja Nazimuddin, Governor-General of Pakistan
 Nishtar Town – Abdur Rab Nishtar, a Pakistan movement leader 
 Phool Nagar - Phool Muhammad Khan, former Minister of the area
 Port Qasim – Muhammad bin Qasim, an Arab Commander
 Qilla Abdullah – Sardar Abdullah Khan Ahmedzai, a Khan of Kalat
 Quaidabad - Muhammad Ali Jinnah
 Rahim Yar Khan – Crown Prince Rahim Yar Khan, who died by burns in a fire at the age of four
 Rajanpur – Makhdoom Sheikh Rajan Shah
 Sadiqabad – Amīr Sadiq Mohammad Khan V
 Safdarabad - Safdar-Ul-Haq Dogar (d.1989)
 Shaheed Benazirabad District – Shaheed Benazir Bhutto, a two-time prime minister of Pakistan
 Shaheed Sikandarabad District, Balochistan - Mir Sikandar Khan Zehri (d.2013), son of the Chief Minister of Balochistan, Sanaullah Khan Zehri
 Shaheed Fazil Rahu - Fazil Rahu
 Sheikhupura – Jahangir's nickname Shekhu 
 Shujabad – Nawab Shuja Khan
 Tando Muhammad Khan – Mir Muhammad Khan Talpur Shahwani
 Toba Tek Singh – Tek Singh, Sikh religious figure

Former:
 Edwardesabad was the name of Bannu – Sir Herbert B. Edwardes
 Fort Sandeman was the name of Zhob – Sir Robert Sandeman
 Lyallpur was the name of Faisalabad – Alfred Comyn Lyall
 Montgomery was the name of Sahiwal – Sir Robert Montgomery

Panama

Papua New Guinea
 Finschhafen – Otto Finsch
 Hatzfeldhafen – Paul von Hatzfeldt
 Heldsbach – German missioner Friedrich Held, who died of malaria in 1901
 Lake Murray Rural LLG – Hubert Leonard Murray
 Marienberg Rural LLG – Marie von Bismarck (1848–1926)
 Markham District – Albert Hastings Markham
 Mount Hagen – Curt von Hagen (1859–1897)
 Mount Wilhelm Rural LLG – Wilhelm von Bismarck
 Port Moresby – Admiral Sir Fairfax Moresby
 Queen Carola Harbour – Carola of Vasa
 West Ferguson Rural LLG – Sir James Fergusson, 6th Baronet

Paraguay

Former:
 Doña Heriberta Stroessner de Iglesias was the name of Alto Verá – Heriberta Stroessner de Iglesias, Alfredo Stroessner's sister
 Domingo Robledo was the name of Natalio – Domingo Robledo (1911–1972), Intendent of Encarnacion
 Fortin Lopez de Filippis was the name of Mariscal Estigarribia – Captain Cesar Lopez de Filippis, Paraguayan military who died during the Chaco War on 1933
 Puerto Presidente Stroessner was the name of Ciudad del Este – Alfredo Stroessner

Peru

Philippines

Poland

Portugal

 Costa Cabral (Porto) – António Bernardo da Costa Cabral, 1st Marquis of Tomar
 Doutor Augusto de Castro (Lisboa) - Augusto de Castro (1883-1971), lawyer, diplomat and politician
 Figueira de Castelo Rodrigo –  count Rodrigo González Girón
 Gomes da Costa (Porto) – Manuel Gomes da Costa
 Guerra Junqueiro (Porto) - Guerra Junqueiro
 Guimarães – Vímara Peres
 Lisbon (Latin, Olisipo, Olisipo Felicitas Iulia, Felicitas Julia Olissipo, Ulyssipolis, Ulisseia) – Ulysses
 Marechal Carmona (Lisboa) – Óscar Carmona, President
 Marques de Pombal (Lisboa) - Sebastião José de Carvalho e Melo, 1st Marquis of Pombal
 Montijo e Afonsoeiro – King Afonso I of Portugal
 Norton de Matos (Coimbra) – José Norton de Matos, a Portuguese general and politician
 Porto Moniz – Francisco Moniz
 Padre Cruz (Lisbon) – Francisco Rodrigues da Cruz (1859–1948), Portuguese priest
 Rainha D. Leonor (Albufeira) – Eleanor of Viseu
 Santa Joana (parish) – Joanna, Princess of Portugal
 São Vicente, Madeira – Vincent of Saragossa
 Vale de Afonsinho – Afonso I of Portugal
 Vila Boa do Bispo – D. Sisnando, bishop of Porto
 Vila do Bispo –  Bishop Fernando Coutinho
 Vila do Conde – Mumadona Dias
 Vila Real – King Denis of Portugal
 Vila Real de Santo António – Joseph I of Portugal

Puerto Rico
 Amalia Marin (Ponce) – Amalia Marín Castilla (1876–1957) 
 Baldorioty De Castro (Ponce) – Román Baldorioty de Castro
 Betances (Cabo Rojo) – Ramón Emeterio Betances, Puerto Rican lawyer
 Bolívar (Santurce) – Simon Bolivar
 Caguas, Puerto Rico – chief Caguax
 Carolina, Puerto Rico – King Charles II of Spain
 Cataño, Puerto Rico – Hernando de Cataño
 Eleanor Roosevelt (Hato Rey) – Eleanor Roosevelt, American Politician
 Fajardo, Puerto Rico – Juan Antonio Fajardo (founder)
 Fernando L.Garcia (Utuado) – Fernando Luis García
 Gobernador Piñero, San Juan, Puerto Rico – Jesús T. Piñero, Governor of Puerto Rico
 Isabela, Puerto Rico – Queen Isabella I of Castile
 Isabel Segunda, Puerto Rico – Isabella II of Spain
 Jaime L. Drew (Ponce) – Jaime L. Drew, Puerto Rican educator
 John F. Kennedy (Mayaguez) – John F. Kennedy
 Juana Díaz, Puerto Rico – Doña Juana Díaz
 Lares, Puerto Rico – Don Amador de Lariz, Spanish nobleman
 Levittown, Puerto Rico – William Levitt
 López Sicardó (Oriente) – Dr. Rafael Lopez Sicardo (1875–1937)
 Luis Llorens Torres (Santurce) – Luis Lloréns Torres
 Manuel A. Pérez (San Juan) – Manuel Pérez (teacher)
 Marín (Patillas) and Luis Muñoz Marín (San Lorenzo) – Luis Muñoz Marín, 1st Governor of the Commonwealth of Puerto Rico
 Morel Campos (Ponce) – Juan Morel Campos
 Muñoz Rivera (Patillas) – Luis Muñoz Rivera, Puerto Rican poet, journalist and politician
 Nemesio Canales (San Juan) – Nemesio Canales
 Ponce, Puerto Rico – Juan Ponce de León or Juan Ponce de León y Loayza, great-grandson of Spanish 
 Rafael Hernández (Aguadilla) – Rafael Hernández Marín
 Roosevelt Roads (Ceiba) – Franklin D. Roosevelt
 San Germán, Puerto Rico – Germaine of Foix, the new queen of King Fernando or Saint Germanus of Auxerre
 Villa Georgetti (Barceloneta) – Eduardo Georgetti

Qatar
 Umm Salal Ali – Ali bin Jassim Al Thani, a son of Qatar's former ruler
 Umm Salal Mohammed – Sheikh Mohammed bin Jassim Al Thani

Romania

Russia

Saint Kitts and Nevis
 Charlestown, Nevis – Charles II of England

Saint Lucia
 Castries – Charles Eugene Gabriel de La Croix, Marquis de Castries, French Marshal
 Rodney Bay – British naval officer George Brydges Rodney

Saint Vincent and the Grenadines
 Charlestown, Saint Vincent and the Grenadines – Charles II of England
 Georgetown, Saint Vincent and the Grenadines – George III of the United Kingdom
 Port Elizabeth, Saint Vincent and the Grenadines – Queen Elizabeth II

São Tomé e Príncipe
 Agostinho Neto (São Tomé) – Agostinho Neto, Angolan President

Saudi Arabia
 King Abdul Aziz Port – Ibn Saud
 King Abdullah Economic City – Abdullah of Saudi Arabia
 King Khalid Military City – Khalid of Saudi Arabia

Saint Helena, Ascension and Tristan da Cunha
 Edinburgh of the Seven Seas – The Prince Alfred, Duke of Edinburgh
 Jamestown – James, Duke of York
 Georgetown – George III

Senegal
 Djily Mbaye (Dakar) – El Hadj Djily Mbaye (1927–1991)
 Richard Toll – Jean Michel Claude Richard, French botanist
 Saint-Louis – Louis XIV of France

Serbia

Seychelles
 Mahé - largest island in the country, named after Bertrand-François Mahé de La Bourdonnais, the French naval officer
 Victoria - capital of Seychelles, named after Queen Victoria

Sierra Leone
 Aberdeen, Sierra Leone – George Hamilton-Gordon, 4th Earl of Aberdeen
 Bureh Town – Bai Bureh, a Sierra Leonean pro independent leader
 Charlotte, Sierra Leone – Princess Charlotte of Wales
 Granville Town, Province of Freedom – Granville Sharp
 Newton, Sierra Leone – British abolitionist John Newton
 Ricketts, Sierra Leone – Henry Ricketts
 Samuel Town, Sierra Leone – Pa Samai, great Mende warrior from the south of Sierra Leone
 Wellington, Freetown – Arthur Wellesley, 1st Duke of Wellington

Singapore
 Alexandra, Singapore – Alexandra of Denmark
 Balestier – Joseph Balestier
 Clementi, Singapore – Cecil Clementi
 MacPherson, Singapore – Lieutenant Colonel Ronald MacPherson (1837–1869)
 Mount Faber – Captain Charles Edward Faber
 Mount Vernon, Singapore – British Royal Navy Vice Admiral Edward Vernon
 Newton, Singapore – Alfred Howard Vincent Newton
 Queenstown, Singapore – Queen Elizabeth II
 Thomson, Singapore – John Turnbull Thomson

Slovakia

 Bernolákovo – Anton Bernolák, Slovak linguist and Catholic priest
 Bratislava – Braslav, Duke of Lower Pannonia
 Gabčíkovo – Jozef Gabčík, a Slovak soldier involved in Operation Anthropoid
 Golianovo – Ján Golian, Slovak Brigade General
 Hamuliakovo – Martin Hamuljak, Slovak Writer
 Hurbanovo – Jozef Miloslav Hurban, Slovak writer
 Kalinkovo – Joachim Kalinka (1601–1678), Slovak poet and priest
 Leopoldov – Leopold I, Holy Roman Emperor
 Malinovo, Slovakia –  Soviet Marshal Rodion Malinovsky
 Martin, Slovakia – Saint Martin of Tours
 Michalovce – Saint Michael
 Mojzesovo – Štefan Moyses
 Nálepkovo – Ján Nálepka, anti-fascist Slovak captain
 Palárikovo – Ján Palárik (1822–1876), Slovak playwright
 Sládkovičovo – Andrej Sládkovič, Slovak poet
 Štefanovičová – Dr. Miloš Štefanovič (1854–1904), Slovak lawyer
 Štúrovo – Ľudovít Štúr, 19th-century Slovak national leader
 Svätoplukovo –  Svätopluk II, Prince of Moravia
 Tešedíkovo – Samuel Tešedík, Slovak Lutheran priest
 Tomášikovo – Samo Tomášik, Slovak poet

Slovenia
 Kidričevo – Boris Kidrič, Prime Minister of Slovenia
 Primoži – Primož Trubar, Father of the Slovenian nation
 Semič – Stanko Semič (1915–1985), Slovenian national hero

Somalia
Former:
 Bandar Qassim was the name of Bosaso – named after city's founder Qassim
 Villaggio Duca degli Abruzzi was the former name of Jowhar - named after HRH Prince Luigi Amedeo, Duke of the Abruzzi of Savoy

South Africa

 Benoni – the original name of the Biblical Benjamin
 Durban – Sir Benjamin d'Urban
 Johannesburg – Johannes Rissik; Johannes Meyer
 Pietermaritzburg – Two theories exist.
 In the theory officially accepted today by the city, it bears the name of Voortrekker leaders Piet Retief and Gert Maritz.
 In another theory, the city was originally named after Retief alone, initially "Pieter Mouriets Burg" (after his given names) and transformed to its current form.
 Port Elizabeth – Elizabeth Donkin (wife of acting governor Sir Rufane Shaw Donkin)
 Pretoria – Andries Pretorius

South Georgia and the South Sandwich Islands
 King Edward Point – Edward VII
 Prince Olav Harbour – Crown Prince Olav of Norway

South Korea
 Danwon-gu – Gim Hongdo
 Sejong City – Sejong the Great
 Chumgmu-ro – Admiral Yi Sun-sin
 Euljiro – General Eulji Mundeok

Spain

Sudan
 Abu Hamad – Sheikh Abu Hamed
 Suakin, formerly named Ptolemais Theron – Ptolemy II Philadelphus

Suriname

 Albina, Suriname - Albina Josefine Liezenmaier (1815-1904)
 Bernharddorp - Prince Bernhard of Lippe-Biesterfeld or Saint Bernard of Clairvaux
 Brownsweg – John Brown, 19th century gold miner
 Cabendadorp - Chief Joseph Cabenda (1925-2012)
 Corneliskondre - Chief Cornelis Tapopi
 Donderskamp - Peter Donders
 Julianatop – Queen Juliana of the Netherlands
 Lelydorp – Cornelis Lely (the Dutch governor of Suriname in 1905)
 Marshallkreek – Captain Marshall, who explored in Marshall's Creek, Suriname

Sweden
 Borstahusen – Rasmus Andersson Borste and Jöns Andersson Borste, fishermen
 Charlottenberg – Charlotta Larsson (1797–1856) (wife of the founder of the industry)
 Dorotea – Frederica Dorothea Wilhelmina of Baden, Swedish queen
 Eskilstuna – Saint Eskil
 Filipstad – Karl Filip, the son of King Charles IX of Sweden
 Flemingsberg – Henrik Klasson Fleming, Lord Marshal, owner, 16th century
 Fredrika – Frederica Dorothea Wilhelmina of Baden, Swedish queen
 Gustavsberg – Gustaf Oxenstierna, father of the owner, 17th century
 Jakobsberg – Jakob Lilliehöök, owner, 17th century
 Karlsborg (Västra Götaland) – King Charles XIV John of Sweden
 Karlsborg, Kalix Municipality – King Charles XV of Sweden
 Karlshamn – King Charles X Gustav of Sweden
 Karlskoga – King Charles IX of Sweden
 Karlskrona – King Charles XI of Sweden
 Karlstad – King Charles IX of Sweden
 Katrineholm – Catharina von der Linde, daughter of the estate owner, 17th century
 Kramfors – Christoffer Kramm (1690–1752)
 Kristianopel – King Christian IV of Denmark
 Kristianstad – King Christian IV of Denmark
 Kristinehamn – Queen Christina of Sweden
 Kungens Kurva – King Gustav V of Sweden
 Kungsängen – King Gustaf VI Adolf of Sweden
 Mariefred – Mary, mother of Jesus
 Mariestad – Queen Mary, wife of Charles IX of Sweden
 Örnsköldsvik – Per Abraham Örnsköld, county governor of Västernorrland County, 1762–1769
 Oskarshamn – King Oscar I of Sweden
 Ulricehamn – Queen Ulrika Eleonora of Sweden
 Vilhelmina – Frederica Dorothea Wilhelmina of Baden, Swedish queen

Switzerland

 Augst (near the ancient city of Augusta Raurica) – Roman Emperor Augustus
 Kaiseraugst (also near Augusta Raurica) – Augustus
 St. Gallen – Saint Gall

Syria
 Abu Kamal – the Kamal Family
 Al-Bitariyah – Salah al-Din al-Bitar
 Al-Malikiyah – Adnan al-Malki, a Syrian Army officer 
 Al-Qadmus – Cadmus, Phoenician prince
 Apamea (Syria) – Apama, wife of Seleucus I Nicator
 Arwad, formerly Antiochia in Pieria – Antiochus I Soter
 Dahiyat al-Assad – Hafez al-Assad, President of Syria
 Latakia, formerly Laodicea – Laodice of Macedonia, mother of Seleucus I Nicator
 Mount Simeon District – Simeon Stylites
 Muadamiyat al-Sham – Al-Mu'azzam Isa, Kurdish Sultan from Ayyubid dynasty
 Palmyra (modern) (Tadumr) – named after a daughter of one of Noah's distant descendants, who was buried in a city
 Qura al-Assad – Hafez al-Assad
 Salaheddine District – Saladin
 Sayyidah Zaynab – Zaynab bint Ali
Former:
 Laodicea ad Libanum was the name of a Hellenistic settlement – a woman named Laodice among the Seleucids
 Seleucia ad Belum was the name of a Hellenistic settlement – a Seleucus of the Seleucid dynasty

Tajikistan
 Avicenna District (Dushanbe) – Avicenna, Persian Polymath
 Ayni District – Tajik national poet Sadriddin Ayni
 Devashtich District - Divashtich,  a medieval Sogdian ruler in Transoxiana
 Dustmurod Aliev (jamoat) – Dustmurod Aliev (1950–1989), Tajik musician and singer
 Dzhami District – 15th century Tajik-Persian Poet Abdurahman Jami
 Ferdowsi district (Dushanbe) – Ferdowsi, Persian Poet
 Ghafurov – Tajik historian and President of Tajikistan during the soviet era, Bobojon Ghafurov
 Gojo Berdiboev (Murghob) - Gojo Berdiboev (1940-2001), President of the Murgab region
 Hamadoni District – 14th-century Persian poet Mir Sayyid Ali Hamadani
 Ismoili Somoni – Isma'il ibn Ahmad
 Jabbor Rasulov District – Prime Minister of Tajikistan during the Soviet era, Jabbor Rasulov
 Mirsaid Mirshakar (town or jamoat) – Mirsaid Mirshakar, a Tajik administrator, author, playwright and poet
 Muminsho Abdulvosiev (Rushon) – Muminsho Abdulvosiev (1933–1992), Tajik statesman
 Nazarsho Dodhudoev (Rushan) – Nazarsho Dodhudoev (1915–2000), Tajik statesman
 Nosiri Khusrav District – 11th century Persian-Tajik poet Nosiri Khusrav
 Rahimzoda – Boki Rahimzoda (1910–1980), Tajik Poet
 Rudaki, Tajikistan – Rudaki, a Persian Poet
 Rumi District – Tajik-Persian poet and philosopher Jaloliddin Rumi
 Safar Amirshoev – Safar Amirshoev (1912–1944), World War II hero
 Shah Mansur district (Dushanbe) – King Mansur I
 Shamsiddin Shohin District – Tajik Poet Shamsiddin Shohin
 Shogadoev – Munavvar Shogadoev (1898–1974), President of Tajikistan during the soviet era
 Spitamen District – Spitamenes, a Sogdian warlord leader of the uprising
 Temurmalik District – Tajik Medieval hero Timur Malik
 Tursunzoda – Tajik national poet Mirzo Tursunzoda
 Tursun Uljaboev – Tursun Uljabayev, Prime Minister of Tajikistan during the soviet era
Former:
 Alexandria Eschate was the name of Khujand in antiquity – Alexander the Great
 Leninabad was the name of Khujand from 1936 through 1991 – Vladimir Lenin
 Stalinabad was the name of Dushanbe from 1929 through 1961 – Joseph Stalin

Tanzania
 Nyerere (Ward of Zanzibar City) – Julius Nyerere, President of Tanzania

Thailand
 Chaophraya Surasak – Chaophraya Surasakmontri
 Chulabhorn District, Nakhon Si Thammarat Province – Princess Chulabhorn
 Galyani Vadhana District, Chiang Mai Province – Princess Galyani Vadhana
 Mae Fa Luang District –  Princess Mother Srinagarindra (Mae Fa Luang)
 Phaya Mengrai District, Chiang Rai Province – King Mangrai (Mengrai)
 Prachaksinlapakhom District – Prince Prachaksinlapakhom (1856–1924)
 Sirindhorn District, Ubon Ratchathani Province – HRH Princess Sirindhorn
 Srinagarindra District, Phatthalung Province – HRH Princess Srinagarindra
 Ubolratana District, Khon Kaen Province – Princess Ubol Ratana
 Vibhavadi District, Surat Thani Province – Princess Vibhavadi Rangsit
 Wachirabarami District, Phichit Province – Prince Vajiralongkorn (now King Vajiralongkorn)
 Watthana District, Bangkok – Princess Galyani Vadhana, alternative transliteration

Trinidad and Tobago
 Charlotteville – Charlotte of Mecklenburg-Strelitz
 Diego Martin – Don Diego Martin (explorer)
 Duncan Village (Penal–Debe) - Duncan Sandys
 Princes Town – Prince Albert Victor, Duke of Clarence and King George V
 Williamsville - Eric Williams

Tunisia
 El-Mansuriya – al-Mansur bi-Nasr Allah
 Mahdia, formerly Aphrodisium – Abdullah al-Mahdi Billah
 Menzel Bourguiba – Habib Bourguiba, first President of Tunisia

Turkey

Turkmenistan
 Alty Garlyev (Ahal) - Alty Garlyev (1903-1953), Turkmen writer and poet
 Andalyp (city) – Nurmuhammet Andalyp (1660–1740), Turkmen philosopher
 Arkadag - Gurbanguly Berdimuhamedow (Arkadag), former president
 Ashgabat – Arsaces I of Parthia
 Aşyr Kakabaýew adyndaky (Dashoguz) - Aşyr Kakabaýew (1909-1968), Turkmen cotton grower
 Babadaýhan - Bābā-Dihqān, Iranian mythological figure
 Balyş Öwezow (Görogly) – Balysh Ovezov, Prime Minister of Turkmenistan during the soviet era
 Durdyýew adyndaky (Mary) - Ýylgaý Durdyýew (1934-1997), Turkmen writer and poet
 Görogly (city) - Koroghlu, a semi-mystical hero 
 Jumanyýaz Hudaýbergenow adyndaky (Dashoguz) - Jumanyýaz Hudaýbergenow (1912-1943), World War II hero
 Kerbabayeva – Berdy Kerbabayev, Turkmen writer
 Kulyýewa adyndaky (Lebap) - Gylyç Kulyýew (1913-1990), Turkmen writer and diplomat
 Kurbanow Daýhan Birleşigi (Ahal) - Abdylla Kurbanow (1913-1985), Turkmen scientist
 Magtymguly District – Magtymguly Pyragy, Turkmen poet
 Magtymguly Garlyýew (Gurbansoltan Eje) – Magtymguly Garly (1889–1957), Turkmen musician
 Mollanepes – Turkmen National writer, Mollanepes (1810–1862)
 Oguzhan (town) - Oghuz Khagan, the mythical progenitor of the Turkic nations
 Orazgeldi Ärsaryýew adyndaky (Dashoguz) - Orazgeldi Ärsaryýew (1900-1978), Turkmen hero
 Rejepguly Ataýew adyndaky (Dashoguz) - Rejepguly Ataýew (1920-1972), Hero of Socialist Labor
 Saparmyrat Türkmenbaşy – Saparmurat Niyazov
 Sadylla Rozmetow adyndaky (Dashoguz) - Sadylla Rozmetow (1920-2011), Hero of Turkmenistan
 Seýdi – Seitnazar Seidi (1775–1836), Turkmen patriot and poet
 Shabat, Turkmenistan - Anusha, Khan of Khiva
 Şabende adyndaky (Dashoguz) - Abdylla Şabende (1720-1800), Turkmen writer
 Şükür bagşy adyndaky (Ahal) - Şükür bagşy (1831-1928), Turkmen folk bard
 Tagan Baýramdurdyýew adyndaky (Ahal) - Tagan Baýramdurdyýew (1909-1977), Turkmen hero
 Turkmenbashi – Saparmurat "Turkmenbashi" Niyazov
 Zelili adyndaky (Lebap) - Zelili (1779-1836), Turkmen poet

Former:
 Alexandria was given the name of Merv – Alexander the Great
 Antiochia in Margiana was given the name of Merv – Antiochus I Soter
 Atamyrat was given the name of Kerki – Atamyrat Niyazov, Father of Saparmurat Niyazov who died during World War II
 Gurbansoltan Eje  was given the name of Andalyp (city) – Gurbansoltan Eje, former president Saparmurat Niyazov's mother
 Kalinin was given the name of Boldumsaz - Mikhail Kalinin
 Kirovsk was given the name of Babadaýhan - Sergei Kirov
 Leninsk was given the name of Turkmenabat – Vladimir Lenin
 Nyýazow was given the name of Shabat, Turkmenistan – Saparmurat Niyazov, President of Turkmenistan
 Stalin was given the name of Murgap, Turkmenistan - Joseph Stalin
 Telmansk was given the name of Gubadag - Ernst Thälmann
 Voro’silovabad was given the name of Boldumsaz - Kliment Voroshilov

Uganda
 Fort Portal – Sir Gerald Portal (British commissioner)
 Port Bell – Sir Hesketh Bell (British commissioner)

Ukraine

United Arab Emirates
 Khalifa City – Khalifa bin Zayed Al Nahyan, President of the United Arab Emirates
 Port Rashid – Rashid bin Saeed Al Maktoum, ruler of Dubai
 Zayed City – Zayed bin Sultan Al Nahyan

United Kingdom

Great Britain

Northern Ireland
 County Tyrone – Eógan mac Néill, son of Niall of the Nine Hostages
 Craigavon – Lord Craigavon, former Prime Minister
 Helen's Bay – Lady Helen Dufferin
 Randalstown – Randal MacDonnell
 Victoria Bridge, County Tyrone – Queen Victoria

United States

United States Virgin Islands
 Charlotte Amalie – Charlotte Amalie of Hesse-Kassel (or Hesse-Cassel)
 Christiansted – Christian VI of Denmark
 Frederiksted – Frederick V of Denmark

Uruguay
 Andresito – Andrés Guazurary
 Artigas – José Artigas
 Baltasar Brum (Artigas Department) – Baltasar Brum, President of Uruguay
 Bernabé Rivera (Artigas Department) – General Bernabe Rivera
 Brigadier General Diego Lamas (Artigas Department) 
 Florencio Sánchez (Colonia Department) – Florencio Sánchez
 Flores Department – Venancio Flores
 General Liber Seregni – Liber Seregni, Uruguayan military and politician
 Ismael Cortinas (Flores Department) – Ismael Cortinas
 Javier de Viana (Artigas Department) – Javier de Viana
 Joaquín Suárez (Canelones Department) – Joaquín Suárez
 José Batlle y Ordóñez (Lavalleja Department) – José Batlle y Ordóñez, President of Uruguay
 Juan Lacaze (Colonia Department) – Juan Luis Lacaze
 Lavalleja Department – Juan Antonio Lavalleja
 Ombúes de Lavalle (Colonia Department) – Juan Lavalle
 Rivera – Fructuoso Rivera
 San Antonio (Canelones Department) – Saint Anthony of Padua
 San Bautista (Canelones Department) – Saint John the Baptist
 San Jacinto (Canelones Department) – Saint Hyacinth of Cracow (in honor of bishop Jacinto Vera)
 San José Department – Saint Joseph
 San Luis (Canelones Department) – Saint Louis IX
 San Ramón (Canelones Department) – Saint Raymond Nonnatus
 Santa Lucía (Canelones Department) – Saint Lucy
 Santa Rosa (Canelones Department) – Saint Rose of Lima
 Santiago Vázquez (Montevideo Department) – Santiago Vázquez
 Soca (Canelones Department) – Francisco Soca
 Tomas Gomensoro (Artigas Department) – Tomás Gomensoro Albín, President of Uruguay

Uzbekistan
 Abdurahmonov nomidag (Tashkent) – Abdujabbor Abdurahmonov (1907–1975), President of Uzbekistan from 1938 to 1950
 Ahmad Yassaviy (Tashkent) – Ahmad Yasawi
 Ahmad Yugnakiy (Tashkent) – Edib Ahmed bin Mahmud Yüknekî (poet)
 Antiochia in Scythia – Antiochus I Soter
 F. Yuldashev (Bulungur) – Faizulla Yuldashev (1912–1991), veteran of the Great Patriotic War
 Gagarin, Uzbekistan – Yuri Gagarin
 Gani Azamov, Qoraqamish – Gani Azamov (1909–2001), Uzbek actor
 H.Tursunqulov (Tashkent) – Hamrakul Tursunkulov (1892–1965), Chairman of the collective farm 
 Iskandar (town) – Grand Duke Nicholas Konstantinovich of Russia
 Khamzy (Tashkent) and Khamzy (Uchqorgon) – Hamza Hakimzade Niyazi, poet
 Mirzo Ulugbek, Ulugbek (town) – Ulugh Beg, astronomer, mathematician and sultan
 Navoiy – Uzbek poet Alisher Navoi
 Sharof Rashidov District (Jizzakh) – Sharof Rashidov, President of Uzbekistan from 1950 to 1959
 Oxunboboyev (Shurchi) – Yuldash Akhunbabaev
 Shaykhontohur –  Sheikh Khovendi at-Takhu, a famous thinker and educator 
 Sobir Rahimov nomli (Bostanlyk) – Sobir Rakhimov
 T.Ahmedov nomidag (Sirdaryo) – Turgun Ahmedov (1925–1944), World War II hero
 U.Musaev (Yangiyul) – Ubaydulla Musaev (1914–1972), Uzbek political figure
 Zakirov (Tashkent) – Qodir Zokirov, Uzbek scientist, botanist and educator

Former:
 "Akhunbabaev" was the name of Jalaquduq – Soviet Uzbek state figure Yuldash Akhunbabaev (1885–1943)
 "Akmal-Ikramov" was the name of Uchtepa – Akmal Ikramov
 "Kuybishevo" was the name of Rishtan – Valerian Kuybyshev
 "Leninsk" was the name of Asaka, Uzbekistan – Vladimir Lenin
 "Skobelev" was the name of Fergana – Mikhail Skobelev
 "Sobir Rakhimov" was the name of Olmazar – Sobir Rakhimov
 "Hamza" was the name of Yashnobod – Hamza Hakimzade Niyazi

Venezuela

 Alberto Adriani Municipality – Alberto Adriani Mazzei (1898–1936), economist and writer
 Alberto Arvelo Torrealba Municipality – Alberto Arvelo Torrealba, Venezuelan lawyer, educator and folklorical poet
 Andrés Eloy Blanco Municipality, Barinas – Andres Eloy Blanco, Venezuelan poet
 Angostura Municipality, Venezuela or Raúl Leoni Municipality – Venezuelan President Raúl Leoni
 Antonio Pinto Salinas Municipality – Antonio Pinto Salinas (1915–1953), Venezuelan poet
 Aristides Bastidas Municipality – Aristides Bastidas, Venezuelan writer
 Arzobispo Chacón Municipality – Acacio Chacon Guerra (1884–1978)
 Caracciolo Parra Olmedo Municipality – Caracciolo Parra Olmedo (1819–1908), Venezuelan lawyer and politician
 Cardenal Quintero Municipality – José Humberto Quintero Parra
 Carlos Arvelo Municipality – Carlos Arvelo, Venezuelan doctor and politician.
 Ciudad Bolívar – Simón Bolívar
 Ciudad Ojeda – Alonso de Ojeda
 Diego Bautista Urbaneja Municipality – Diego Bautista Urbaneja
 Ezequiel Zamora Municipality, Monagas – General Ezequiel Zamora
 Fernandez Feo Municipality – Bishop of Tachira, Monseñor Alejandro Fernandez-Feo Tinoco (1908–1987)
 Francisco Aniceto Lugo Parish (Delta Amacuaro) – Dr. Francisco Aniceto Lugo (1894–1982), Venezuelan writer
 Francisco Javier Pulgar Municipality (Zuila) – Francisco Javier Pulgar (1877–1959), Venezuelan educator
 Francisco de Miranda, Anzoátegui – Francisco de Miranda, Venezuelan Independence hero
 Francisco Linares Alcántara Municipality – Francisco Linares Alcántara, Venezuelan President
 Jauregui Municipality (Tachira) – Jesus Manuel Jauregui (1848–1905)
 Jesús Enrique Lossada Municipality – Jesus Enrique Lossada (1892–1948), Venezuelan writer
 Jiménez Municipality, Lara – José Florencio Jiménez
 José Tadeo Monagas Municipality – José Tadeo Monagas
 Manuel Monge Municipality – Manuel Monge (1950–1993), President of the Village Association of Poblado 32
 Mario Briceño Iragorry Municipality – Mario Briceño Iragorry
 Maroa, Amazonas – Cacique Maruwa
 Monseñor Iturriza Municipality – Monseñor Francisco José Iturriza Guillen (1903–2003)
 Monseñor Miguel Antonio Salas (Tachira) – Monseñor Miguel Antonio Salas (1915–2003)
 Padre Noguera Municipality – Father Adonay Noguera (1884–1954)
 Padre Pedro Chien Municipality – Father Pedro Chien (1925–1995), a Mongol missioner
 Páez, Apure – José Antonio Páez, an Independence hero
 Paz Castillo Municipality – Venezuelan poet and diplomat Fernando Paz Castillo
 Pedro Gual Municipality – 19th century Venezuelan President Pedro Gual Escandón
 Rafael Rangel Municipality – Rafael Rangel (1877–1909), Venezuelan scientific
 Raul Leoni Parish (Maracaibo) – Raul Leoni
 Rómulo Costa Municipality, Tachira – Dr. Antonio Romulo Costa Duque (1872–1956)
 Rómulo Gallegos Municipality, Apure – Romulo Gallegos, Venezuelan writer and president
 Sifontes Municipality – General Antonio Domingo Sifontes
 Sucre, Miranda – Antonio José de Sucre
 Urdaneta, Miranda – Rafael Urdaneta
 Valmore Rodríguez Municipality (Zuila) – Valmore Rodríguez (1900–1955), Venezuelan journalist

Vietnam
 Bế Văn Đàn (Quảng Hòa) – Bế Văn Đàn (1931–1953), Hero of the People's Armed Forces
 Đề Thám (Lạng Sơn) – Hoàng Hoa Thám "Đề Thám" (1858–1913), leader of Yên Thế Insurrection
 Đình Phong (Cao Bằng) – Đình Phong, a communist soldier
 Đình Phùng, Bảo Lạc – Phan Đình Phùng (1847–1895), Vietnamese poet
 Dương Minh Châu District and Duong Minh Chau town – Dương Minh Châu (1912–1947), a communist lawyer
 Ho Chi Minh City – Ho Chi Minh, President of Vietnam
 Hồ Thị Kỷ (Cà Mau) – Hồ Thị Kỷ (1949–1970), martyr hero
 Hoàng Văn Thụ, Văn Lãng – Hoàng Văn Thụ (1909–1944), Vietnamese revolutionary
 Hồng Dân (Bạc Liêu) –  Trần Hồng Dân (1916–1946), nationalist revolutionary
 Kim Đồng, Thạch An – Kim Đồng (1929–1943), captain of Ho Chi Minh Young Pioneer Organization
 Ngọc Hiển (Cà Mau) – Phan Ngọc Hiển (1910–1941), a local teacher, writer and artist
 Nguyễn Huân (Cà Mau) – Nguyễn Văn Huân (d.1946), communist martyr
 Nông trường Trần Phú – Trần Phú, Vietnamese revolutionary
 Phạm Văn Cội (Củ Chi) – Phạm Văn Cội (1940–1967), Hero of the People's Armed Forces
 Quang Trung, An Lão (Hải Phòng) – Quang Trung, second emperor of the Tây Sơn dynasty
 Trần Hưng Đạo (Lý Nhân) – Trần Hưng Đạo, an imperial prince, statesman and military commander
 Trần Văn Thời District and Trần Văn Thời town – Trần Văn Thời (1902–1942), a local communist

Former:
 Thành Thái Phien – the name of Da Nang in 1945 – revolutionary Thái Phiên

Zambia
 Dag Hammerskjoeld (Ndola) – Dag Hammarskjöld
 Harry Mwaanga Nkumbula (Lusaka) – Harry Nkumbula, Zambian nationalist leader
 Helen Kaunda (Copperbelt) – Ms. Helen Kaunda (d.1973), mother of President Kenneth Kaunda
 John Laing (Lusaka) – John Laing (businessman)
 Julia Chikamoneka (Kasama) – Julia Chikamoneka (1910–1986), Zambian freedom fighter
 Livingstone – doctor David Livingstone
 Lusaka – Chief Lusaka
 Mansa, Zambia - Chief Mansa
 Victoria falls – Queen Victoria

Former:
 Abercorn was the name of Mbala – Lord Abercorn, British nobleman and diplomat
 Bancroft was the name of Chililabombwe - Dr. Joseph Austen Bancroft (1882-1957), British geologist and scientist
 Fort Jameson was the name of Chipata - Leander Starr Jameson, British statesman
 Fort Rosebery was the name of Mansa, Zambia - Archibald Primrose, 5th Earl of Rosebery, Prime Minister of the United Kingdom

Zimbabwe
 Beatrice, Zimbabwe – Beatrice Borrow (1868–1946), the sister of Lieutenant Henry J. Borrow, member of the Pioneer Column
 Beitbridge – Alfred Beit
 Bradfield, Zimbabwe – Edwin Eugene Bradfield (1869–1950)
 Felixburg – Felix Posselt, who visited in that area in 1888
 Montgomery (Bulawayo) – Bernard Montgomery
 Mount Darwin, Zimbabwe – Charles Darwin
 Mount Hampden – John Hampden
 Norton, Zimbabwe – the Norton family
 Selous, Zimbabwe – Frederick Selous
 Victoria falls – Queen Victoria
 West Nicholson – Andy Nicholson, an early prospector
 Zhombe Joel – Joel Tessa, one of the pioneer businessmen at the centre during the 1960s.

Former:
 Fort Victoria was the name of Masvingo – Queen Victoria
 Hartley was the name of Chegutu – Henry Hartley, an early explorer
 Salisbury was the name of Harare – Lord Salisbury

See also
 Lists of places named after people
 List of countries named after people
 List of country subdivisions named after people
 List of islands named after people
 Buildings and structures named after people
 List of eponyms of airports
 List of convention centers named after people
 List of railway stations named after people
 List of colleges and universities named after people
 List of etymologies of country subdivision names
 List of country-name etymologies
 Lists of places by eponym
 List of eponyms
 Lists of etymologies

References

Places

People place names